= Vascular endothelial growth factor C =

Growth factor protein found in humans

VEGFC
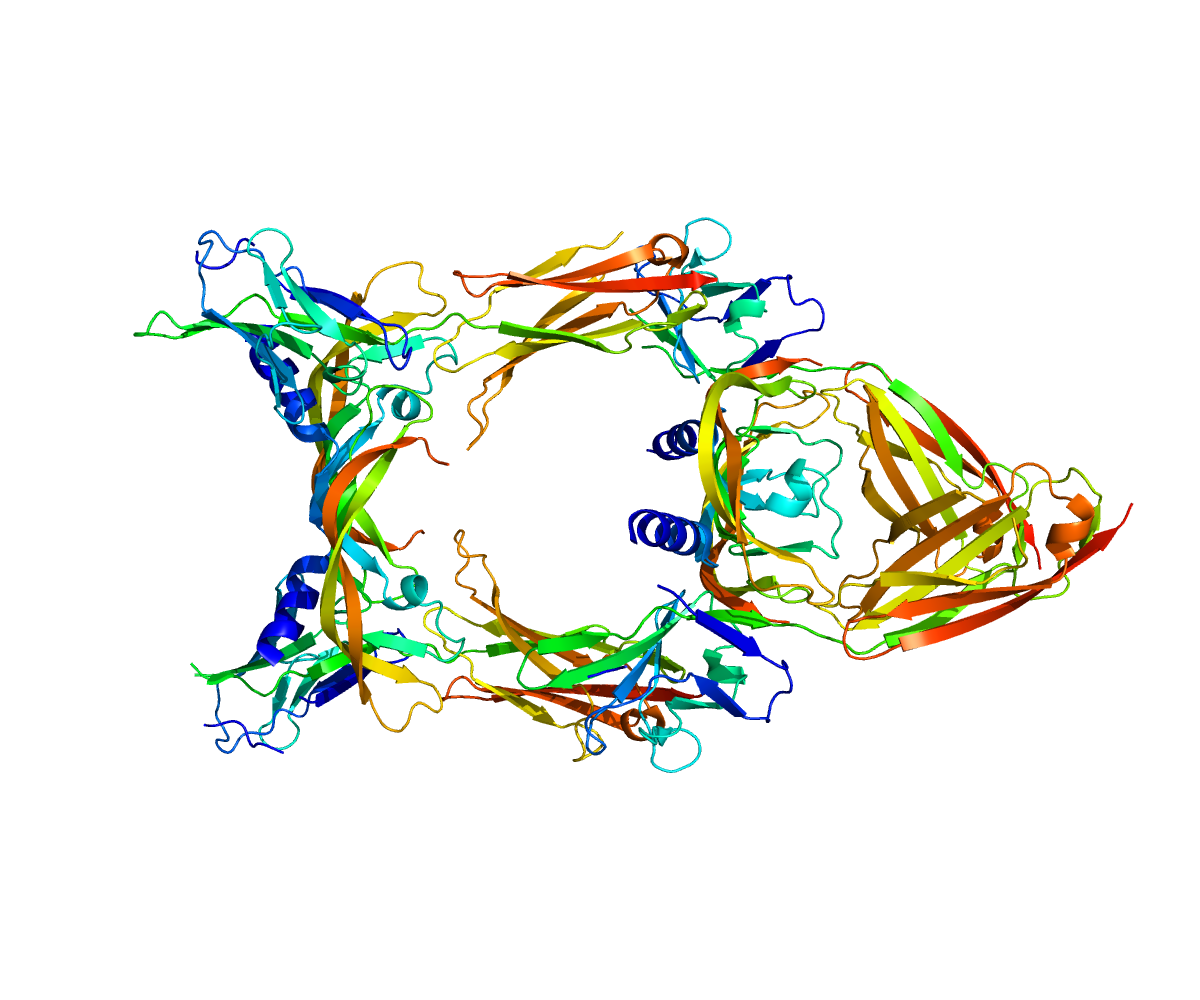

Identifiers
- Aliases: VEGFC, Flt4-L, LMPH1D, VRP, vascular endothelial growth factor C, LMPHM4
- External IDs: OMIM: 601528; MGI: 109124; GeneCards: VEGFC
Available structures
PDB	Ortholog search: PDBe RCSB
PDB	List of PDB id codes 2X1W, 2X1X, 4BSK

Gene location (Human)
Chr.	Chromosome 4 (human)
Band	4q34.3	Start	176,683,538 bp
Band	4q34.3	End	176,792,922 bp

Gene location (Mouse)
Chr.	Chromosome 8 (mouse)
Band	8|8 B1.3	Start	54,530,641 bp
Band	8|8 B1.3	End	54,640,131 bp
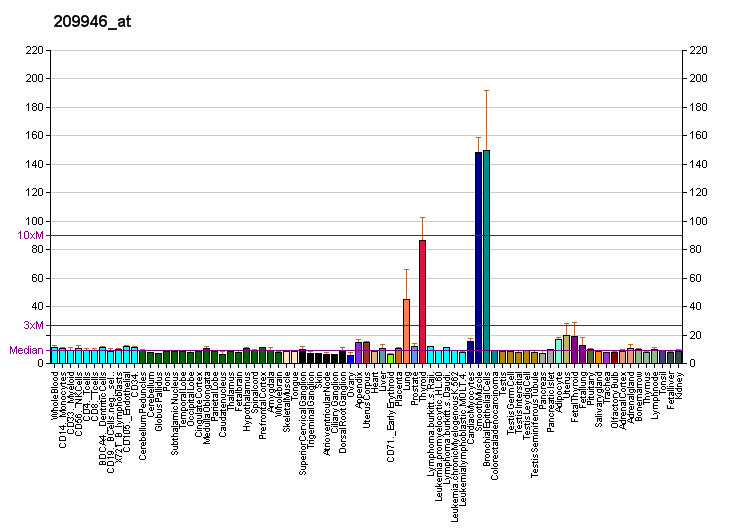
RNA expression pattern
Bgee	Human / Mouse (ortholog); Top expressed in: stromal cell of endometrium; right lobe of thyroid gland; left lobe of thyroid gland; testicle; right lung; decidua; parietal pleura; visceral pleura; pericardium; subcutaneous adipose tissue / Top expressed in: external carotid artery; internal carotid artery; semi-lunar valve; migratory enteric neural crest cell; left lung lobe; abdominal wall; endocardial cushion; aortic valve; conjunctival fornix; stroma of bone marrow; More reference expression data
BioGPS	More reference expression data
Gene ontology
Molecular function	chemoattractant activity; protein binding; growth factor activity; vascular endothelial growth factor receptor 3 binding; vascular endothelial growth factor receptor binding
Cellular component	extracellular region; membrane; platelet alpha granule lumen; extracellular space
Biological process	negative regulation of cell population proliferation; positive regulation of neuroblast proliferation; positive regulation of protein secretion; substrate-dependent cell migration; signal transduction; positive regulation of protein autophosphorylation; multicellular organism development; morphogenesis of embryonic epithelium; positive regulation of cell-matrix adhesion; positive regulation of mast cell chemotaxis; positive regulation of blood vessel endothelial cell migration; positive regulation of cell division; induction of positive chemotaxis; platelet degranulation; positive regulation of peptidyl-tyrosine phosphorylation; negative regulation of blood pressure; positive regulation of cell population proliferation; positive regulation of lymphangiogenesis; regulation of vascular endothelial growth factor receptor signaling pathway; cell differentiation; positive regulation of epithelial cell proliferation; animal organ morphogenesis; positive chemotaxis; angiogenesis; response to hypoxia; positive regulation of endothelial cell proliferation; positive regulation of angiogenesis; cellular response to leukemia inhibitory factor; vascular endothelial growth factor receptor signaling pathway; regulation of signaling receptor activity; positive regulation of protein phosphorylation; sprouting angiogenesis; vascular endothelial growth factor signaling pathway
Sources:Amigo / QuickGO
Orthologs
Databases	NCBI: entry; OMA: entry
Species	Human	Mouse
Entrez	7424	22341
Ensembl	ENSG00000150630	ENSMUSG00000031520
UniProt	P49767	P97953
RefSeq (mRNA)	NM_005429	NM_009506
RefSeq (protein)	NP_005420	NP_033532
Location (UCSC)	Chr 4: 176.68 – 176.79 Mb	Chr 8: 54.53 – 54.64 Mb
PubMed search
- Wikidata
View/Edit Human	View/Edit Mouse

Vascular endothelial growth factor C (VEGF-C) is a protein that is a member of the platelet-derived growth factor / vascular endothelial growth factor (PDGF/VEGF) family. It is encoded in humans by the VEGFC gene, which is located on chromosome 4q34.

== Functions ==
The main function of VEGF-C is to promote the growth of lymphatic vessels (lymphangiogenesis). It acts on lymphatic endothelial cells (LECs) primarily via its receptor VEGFR-3 promoting survival, growth and migration. It was discovered in 1996 as a ligand for the orphan receptor VEGFR-3. Soon thereafter, it was shown to be a specific growth factor for lymphatic vessels in a variety of models. However, in addition to its effect on lymphatic vessels, it can also promote the growth of blood vessels and regulate their permeability. The effect on blood vessels can be mediated via its primary receptor VEGFR-3 or its secondary receptor VEGFR-2. Apart from vascular targets, VEGF-C is also important for neural development and blood pressure regulation.

== Biosynthesis ==
VEGF-C is a dimeric, secreted protein, which undergoes a complex proteolytic maturation resulting in multiple processed forms. After translation, VEGF-C consists of three domains: the central VEGF homology domain (VHD), the N-terminal domain (propeptide) and a C-terminal domain (propeptide). It is referred to as "uncleaved VEGF-C" and has a size of approximately 58 kDa. The first cleavage (which happens already before secretion) occurs between the VHD and the C-terminal domain and is mediated by proprotein convertases. However, the resulting protein is still held together by disulfide bonds and remains inactive (although it can bind already VEGFR-3). This form is referred to as "intermediate form" or pro-VEGF-C and it consists of two polypeptide chains of 29 and 31 kDa. In order to activate VEGF-C, a second cleavage has to occur between the N-terminal propeptide and the VHD. This cleavage can be performed either by ADAMTS3, plasmin, KLK3/PSA or cathepsin D. With progressing maturation, the affinity of VEGF-C for both VEGFR-2 and VEGFR-3 increases and only the fully processed, mature forms of VEGF-C have a significant affinity for VEGFR-2.

== Relationship to VEGF-D ==
The closest structural and functional relative of VEGF-C is VEGF-D. However, at least in mice, VEGF-C is absolutely essential for the development of the lymphatic system, whereas VEGF-D appears to be unnecessary. Whether this holds true for humans is unknown, because there are major differences between human and mouse VEGF-D.

== Disease relevance ==
In a minority of lymphedema patients, the condition is caused by mutations in the VEGFC gene and VEGF-C is a potential treatment for lymphedema, even though the underlying molecular cause appears more often in the VEGF-Receptor-3 instead of VEGF-C itself. Because in Milroy's disease (Hereditary lymphedema type I), only one allele is mutated, not all VEGFR-3 molecules are non-functional and it is thought, that high amounts of VEGF-C can compensate for the mutated, nonfunctional receptors by increasing the signaling levels of the remaining functional receptors. Therefore, VEGF-C is developed as a lymphedema drug under the name of Lymfactin. Also indirectly VEGF-C can be responsible for hereditary lymphedema: The rare Hennekam syndrome can result from the inability of the mutated CCBE1 to assist the ADAMTS3 protease in activating VEGF-C. While lack of VEGF-C results in lymphedema, VEGF-C production is implicated in tumor lymphangiogenesis and metastasis. Expression of VEGF-C by tumors induces peri-tumoral and intratumoral lymphangiogenesis what potently promotes metastatic dissemination of tumor cells. VEGF-C primarily stimulates lymphangiogenesis by activating VEGFR-3, yet under certain conditions it can also act directly on blood vessels to promote tumor angiogenesis.

== Evolution ==
The PDGF family is so closely related to the VEGF family that the two are sometimes grouped together as the PDGF/VEGF family. In invertebrates, molecules from this families are not easily distinguished from each other and are collectively referred to as PVFs (PDGF/VEGF-like growth factors. The comparison of human VEGFs with these PVFs allows conclusions on the structure of the ancestral molecules, which appear more closely related to today's lymphangiogenic VEGF-C than to the other members of the VEGF family and despite their large evolutionary distance are still able to interact with human VEGF receptors. The PVFs in Drosophila melanogaster have functions for the migration of hemocytes and the PVFs in the jellyfish Podocoryne carnea for the development of the tentacles and the gastrovascular apparatus. However, the function of the PVF-1 of the nematode Caenorhabditis elegans is unknown
