= Ibcasertib =

Chemical compound

Clinical data
- Other names: Chiauranib; CS-2164

Legal status
- Legal status: Investigational

Identifiers
- IUPAC name: N-(2-aminophenyl)-6-(7-methoxyquinolin-4-yl)oxynaphthalene-1-carboxamide
- CAS Number: 1256349-48-0
- PubChem CID: 49779393
- IUPHAR/BPS: 10475
- DrugBank: DB16124
- ChemSpider: 81367270
- UNII: F40IRN5981
- ChEMBL: ChEMBL5095033

Chemical and physical data
- Formula: C_{27}H_{21}N_{3}O_{3}
- Molar mass: 435.483 g·mol^{−1}
- 3D model (JSmol): Interactive image
- SMILES: COC1=CC2=NC=CC(=C2C=C1)OC3=CC4=C(C=C3)C(=CC=C4)C(=O)NC5=CC=CC=C5N
- InChI: InChI=1S/C27H21N3O3/c1-32-18-9-12-22-25(16-18)29-14-13-26(22)33-19-10-11-20-17(15-19)5-4-6-21(20)27(31)30-24-8-3-2-7-23(24)28/h2-16H,28H2,1H3,(H,30,31); Key:BRKWREZNORONDU-UHFFFAOYSA-N

Ibcasertib is an investigational new drug that is being evaluated to treat small-cell lung cancer. Ibcasertib inhibits several angiogenesis-related kinases, including VEGFR1, VEGFR2, VEGFR3, PDGFRα, and c-Kit, as well as the mitosis-related kinase Aurora B and the chronic inflammation-related kinase CSF-1R.
