= Platelet-derived growth factor receptor =

Cell surface receptors

platelet-derived growth factor receptor, alpha polypeptide

Identifiers
- Symbol: PDGFRA
- NCBI gene: 5156
- HGNC: 8803
- OMIM: 173490
- RefSeq: NM_006206
- UniProt: P16234

Other data
- Locus: Chr. 4 q12
Search for
- Structures: Swiss-model
- Domains: InterPro

platelet-derived growth factor receptor, beta polypeptide

Identifiers
- Symbol: PDGFRB
- Alt. symbols: PDGFR
- NCBI gene: 5159
- HGNC: 8804
- OMIM: 173410
- RefSeq: NM_002609
- UniProt: P09619

Other data
- Locus: Chr. 5 q31-q32
Search for
- Structures: Swiss-model
- Domains: InterPro

Platelet-derived growth factor receptor
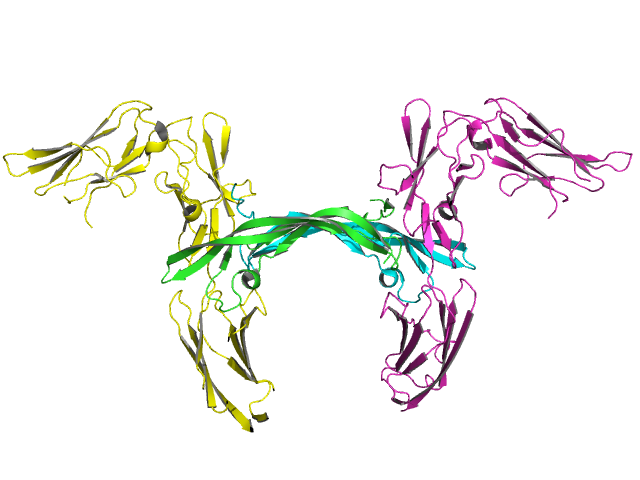
- Ribbon image of two molecules of human PDGF receptor beta (yellow and magenta) in complex with dimeric PDGF-B (cyan and green).

Identifiers
- Symbol: PDGFR
- Pfam: PF04692
- InterPro: IPR006782
- Membranome: 1204
Available protein structures:
- PDB: IPR006782 PF04692 (ECOD; PDBsum)
- AlphaFold: IPR006782; PF04692

Platelet-derived growth factor receptors (PDGF-R) are cell surface tyrosine kinase receptors for members of the platelet-derived growth factor (PDGF) family. PDGF subunits -A and -B are important factors regulating cell proliferation, cellular differentiation, cell growth, development and many diseases including cancer. There are two forms of the PDGF-R, alpha and beta each encoded by a different gene. Depending on which growth factor is bound, PDGF-R homo- or heterodimerizes.

== Mechanism of action ==
The PDGF family consists of PDGF-A, -B, -C and -D, which form either homo- or heterodimers (PDGF-AA, -AB, -BB, -CC, -DD). The four PDGFs are inactive in their monomeric forms. The PDGFs bind to the protein tyrosine kinase receptors PDGF receptor-α and -β. These two receptor isoforms dimerize upon binding the PDGF dimer, leading to three possible receptor combinations, namely -αα, -ββ and -αβ. The extracellular region of the receptor consists of five immunoglobulin-like domains while the intracellular part is a tyrosine kinase domain. The ligand-binding sites of the receptors are located to the three first immunoglobulin-like domains. PDGF-CC specifically interacts with PDGFR-αα and -αβ, but not with -ββ, and thereby resembles PDGF-AB. PDGF-DD binds to PDGFR-ββ with high affinity, and to PDGFR-αβ to a markedly lower extent and is therefore regarded as PDGFR-ββ specific. PDGF-AA binds only to PDGFR-αα, while PDGF-BB is the only PDGF that can bind all three receptor combinations with high affinity.

Dimerization is a prerequisite for the activation of the kinase. Kinase activation is visualized as tyrosine phosphorylation of the receptor molecules, which occurs between the dimerized receptor molecules (transphosphorylation). In conjunction with dimerization and kinase activation, the receptor molecules undergo conformational changes, which allow a basal kinase activity to phosphorylate a critical tyrosine residue, thereby "unlocking" the kinase, leading to full enzymatic activity directed toward other tyrosine residues in the receptor molecules as well as other substrates for the kinase. Expression of both receptors and each of the four PDGFs is under independent control, giving the PDGF/PDGFR system a high flexibility. Different cell types vary greatly in the ratio of PDGF isoforms and PDGFRs expressed. Different external stimuli such as inflammation, embryonic development or differentiation modulate cellular receptor expression allowing binding of some PDGFs but not others. Additionally, some cells display only one of the PDGFR isoforms while other cells express both isoforms, simultaneously or separately.

== Structural domains of PDGFR ==
Signal peptide: PDGFRα signal peptide consists of 23 amino acids, while PDGFRβ signal peptide contains 32 amino acids.

Extracellular domain: Comprises five immunoglobulin-like domains (D1–D5), each with two layers of antiparallel β-sheets. It has multiple glycosylation sites (8 in PDGFRα, 11 in PDGFRβ).

Transmembrane helix: A single transmembrane segment (≈25 amino acids) that transmits extracellular conformational signals to the intracellular region.

Juxtamembrane segment: A ≈40-amino-acid segment between the transmembrane helix and kinase domain, involved in kinase autoinhibition.

Kinase domain: Contains a kinase insert that divides it into kinase split I and kinase split II. It has phosphokinase activity and includes autophosphorylation sites.

C-terminal tail: Rich in serine and threonine, critical for receptor ubiquitination and downregulation.

== Interaction with signal transduction molecules ==
Tyrosine phosphorylation sites in growth factor receptors serve two major purposes—to control the state of activity of the kinase and to create binding sites for downstream signal transduction molecules, which in many cases also are substrates for the kinase. The second part of the tyrosine kinase domain in the PDGFβ receptor is phosphorylated at Tyr-857, and mutant receptors carrying phenylalanine at this position have reduced kinase activity. Tyr-857 has therefore been assigned a role in positive regulation of kinase activity. Sites of tyrosine phosphorylation involved in binding signal transduction molecules have been identified in the juxtamembrane domain, the kinase insert, and in the C-terminal tail in the PDGFβ receptor. The phosphorylated tyrosine residue and in general three adjacent C-terminal amino acid residues form specific binding sites for signal transduction molecules. Binding to these sites involves a common conserved stretches, denoted the Src homology (SH) 2 domain and/or Phosphotyrosine Binding Domains (PTB). The specificity of these interactions appears to be very high, since mutant receptors carrying phenylalanine residues in one or several of the different phosphorylation sites generally lack the capacity to bind the targeted signal transduction molecule. The signal transduction molecules are either equipped with different enzymatic activities, or they are adaptor molecules, which in some but not all cases are found in complexes with subunits that carry a catalytic activity. Upon interaction with the activated receptor, the catalytic activities become up-regulated, through tyrosine phosphorylation or other mechanisms, generating a signal that may be unique for each type of signal transduction molecule.

Examination of the different signaling cascades induced by RTKs established Ras/mitogen-activated protein kinase (MAPK), PI-3 kinase, and phospholipase-γ (PLCγ) pathways as key downstream mediators of PDGFR signaling. In addition, reactive oxygen species (ROS)-dependent STAT3 activation has been established to be a key downstream mediator of PDGFR signaling in vascular smooth muscle cells.

=== MAPK pathway ===
The adaptor protein Grb2 forms a complex with Sos by the Grb2 SH3 domain. Grb2 (or the Grb2/Sos complex) is recruited to the membrane by the Grb2 SH2 domain binding to activated PDGFR-bound SHP2 (also known as PTPN11, a cytosolic PTP), thereby allowing interaction with Ras and the exchange of GDP for GTP on Ras. Whereas the interaction between Grb2 and PDGFR occurs through interaction with the SHP2 protein, Grb2 instead binds to activated EGFR through Shc, another adaptor protein that forms a complex with many receptors via its PTB domain. Once activated, Ras interacts with several proteins, namely Raf. Activated Raf stimulates MAPK-kinase (MAPKK or MEK) by phosphorylating a serine residue in its activation loop. MAPKK then phosphorylates MAPK (ERK1/2) on T and Y residues at the activation-loop leading to its activation. Activated MAPK phosphorylates a variety of cytoplasmic substrates, as well as transcription factors, when translocated into the nucleus. MAPK family members have been found to regulate various biological functions by phosphorylation of particular target molecules (such as transcription factors, other kinases etc.) located in cell membrane, cytoplasm and nucleus, and thus contribute to the regulation of different cellular processes such as cell proliferation, differentiation, apoptosis and immunoresponses.

=== PI3K pathway ===
The class IA phospholipid kinase, PI-3 kinase, is activated by the majority of RTKs. Similarly to other SH2 domain-containing proteins, PI-3 kinase forms a complex with PY sites on activated receptors. The main function of PI3K activation is the generation of PIP3, which functions as a second messenger to activate downstream tyrosine kinases Btk and Itk, the Ser/Thr kinases PDK1 and Akt (PKB). The major biological functions of Akt activation can be classified into three categories – survival, proliferation and cell growth. Akt is also known to be implicated in several cancers, particularly breast. PLCγ is immediately recruited by an activated RTK through the binding of its SH2 domains to phosphotyrosine sites of the receptor. After activation, PLCγ hydrolyses its substrate PtdIns(4,5)P2 and forms two second messengers, diacylglycerol and Ins(1,4,5)P3. Ins(1,4,5)P3 stimulates the release of Ca 2+ from intracellular supplies. Ca 2+ then binds to calmodulin, which subsequently activates a family of calmodulindependent protein kinases (CamKs). In addition, both diacylglycerol and Ca 2+ activate members of the PKC family. The second messengers generated by PtdIns(4,5)P2 hydrolysis stimulate a variety of intracellular processes such as proliferation, angiogenesis, cell motility.

== PDGF/PDGFR signaling pathway in disease ==
PDGF/PDGFR Signaling Pathway in Disease The PDGF/PDGFR signaling pathway plays a crucial role in normal development. In adult organisms, the expression of PDGF ligands and PDGFR receptors, as well as the activation of the PDGF/PDGFR signaling cascade, are tightly regulated at the molecular level. Dysregulated or enhanced activation of this pathway—beyond its well-established physiological role in wound repair—has been implicated in a range of pathological conditions, including cancer, fibrotic disorders, and atherosclerosis.

Role in Wound Healing

PDGF is recognized as a key mediator of wound healing, a complex process typically divided into three sequential phases: inflammatory response, granulation tissue formation, and scar tissue maturation. Following tissue injury, activated platelets release large quantities of PDGF from their α-granules into the wound microenvironment. PDGF contributes to early wound repair by recruiting inflammatory cells (such as neutrophils) and tissue repair cells to the injury site. It also stimulates the production of vasodilatory molecules, including prostacyclin I2 (PGI2) and prostaglandin E2 (PGE2), which induce local hyperemia and support tissue healing. During granulation tissue formation, PDGF primarily promotes the migration and proliferation of fibroblasts, which synthesize and deposit extracellular matrix (ECM) components—including collagen—at the wound site. For scar formation, PDGF acts as a chemotactic factor for neutrophils, monocytes, fibroblasts, and smooth muscle cells, guiding their migration to the wound interface and promoting their differentiation, proliferation, and ECM production. Additionally, PDGF inhibits connective tissue degradation and extends the survival of ECM-producing cells, thereby exerting a selective stimulatory effect on connective tissue growth during scar maturation.

Role in Cancer

Overexpression of PDGF ligands or PDGFR receptors has been frequently reported in various types of human tumors. PDGFs can promote the proliferation, differentiation, and migration of tumor cells through autocrine (acting on the same cell that secretes them) or paracrine (acting on adjacent cells) signaling mechanisms. Moreover, mutations or gene rearrangements involving PDGFRs have been identified as drivers of aberrant kinase activation, contributing to tumorigenesis. Angiogenesis—the formation of new blood vessels—is closely linked to tumor growth, invasion, and metastatic spread. Tumors rely on blood vessels to obtain nutrients and oxygen, while cancer cells use the vascular system to disseminate to distant tissues. As a potent angiogenic factor, PDGF plays a critical role in vascular maturation and the recruitment of pericytes (support cells that stabilize blood vessels). PDGF can also indirectly promote angiogenesis by inducing pericytes to produce and secrete vascular endothelial growth factor (VEGF). Inhibition of the PDGF/PDGFR signaling pathway to block tumor angiogenesis is thus a prominent area of research and therapeutic development in cancer treatment.

Role in Fibrotic Diseases

Activation of the PDGF/PDGFR signaling pathway is commonly associated with the pathogenesis of fibrotic diseases, including hepatic fibrosis, pulmonary fibrosis, and renal fibrosis. Hepatic fibrosis: PDGF functions as a key mitogen for hepatic stellate cells (HSCs), a cell type central to liver fibrogenesis. Activation of HSCs is a critical step in the development of hepatic fibrosis—activated HSCs transition to a myofibroblast-like phenotype and secrete large amounts of ECM. Excessive accumulation of ECM leads to the formation of fibrous scar tissue, and PDGF has been shown to promote the activation, proliferation, and ECM-producing capacity of HSCs.

Pulmonary fibrosis: Lung injury resulting from various causes (such as infection, toxins, or autoimmune processes) can progress to pulmonary fibrosis. PDGF contributes to this process by stimulating fibroblast proliferation, regulating the synthesis and degradation of ECM, and inducing fibroblasts to produce collagenase—an enzyme that causes collagen fragmentation and disorganization. PDGF also recruits neutrophils and macrophages to the injured lung tissue, promoting the release of pro-inflammatory cytokines and mediators that exacerbate inflammation and drive fibrotic remodeling.

Renal fibrosis: Progressive renal fibroproliferative diseases—including IgA nephropathy and membranoproliferative glomerulonephritis—are characterized by mesangial cell proliferation and excessive ECM accumulation in the glomeruli. In normal adult kidneys, the expression of PDGF and its receptors is low, but their levels are significantly upregulated during renal development and in the setting of renal fibrosis. Renal mesangial cells have been shown to express PDGF-B mRNA and secrete PDGF-BB homodimers in vitro. PDGFRβ is constitutively expressed on mesangial cells, and the PDGF-BB/PDGFRββ signaling pathway plays a critical role in promoting mesangial cell proliferation, migration, and ECM secretion—all key processes contributing to the development of renal fibrosis.

== See also ==
- Receptor tyrosine kinase
- PDGF
- Imatinib
- PDGFRA
- PDGFRB
- Crenolanib (CP-868,596-26)
