= Platelet-derived growth factor =

Signaling glycoprotein regulating cell proliferation

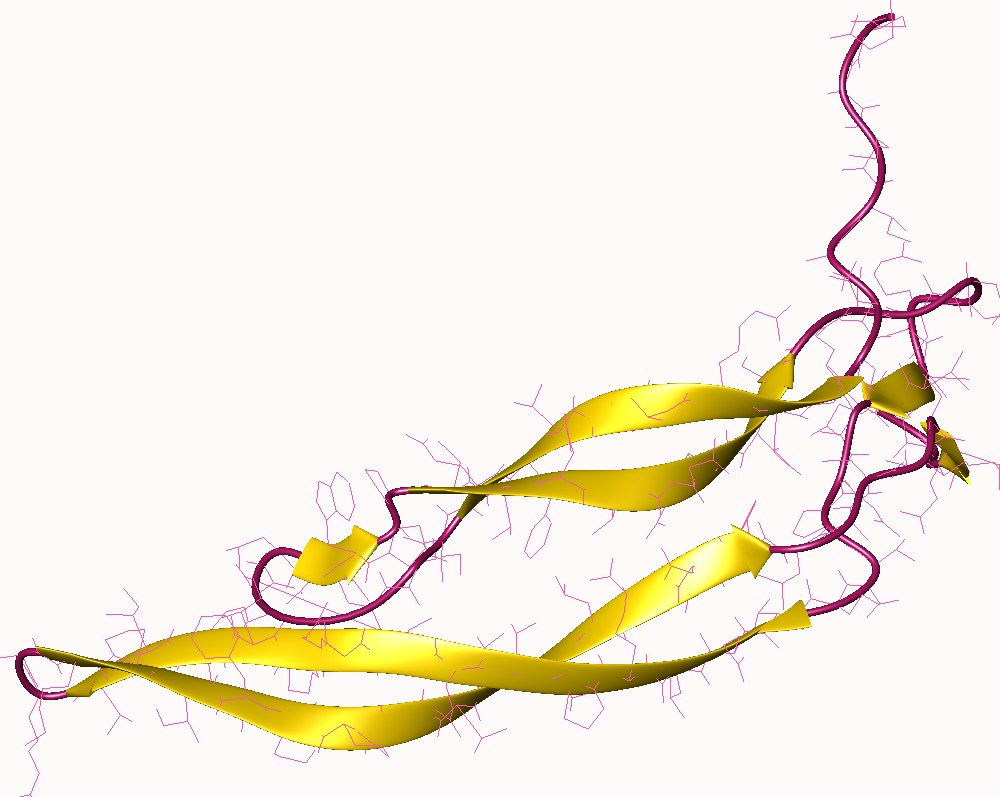
- Platelet-derived growth factor BB monomer, Human

Identifiers
- Symbol: PDGF
- Pfam: PF00341
- InterPro: IPR000072
- PROSITE: PDOC00222
- SCOP2: 1pdg / SCOPe / SUPFAM
Available protein structures:
- PDB: IPR000072 PF00341 (ECOD; PDBsum)
- AlphaFold: IPR000072; PF00341

Platelet-derived growth factor (PDGF) is one among numerous growth factors that regulate cell growth and division. In particular, PDGF plays a significant role in blood vessel formation, the growth of blood vessels from already-existing blood vessel tissue, mitogenesis, i.e. proliferation, of mesenchymal cells such as fibroblasts, osteoblasts, tenocytes, vascular smooth muscle cells and mesenchymal stem cells as well as chemotaxis, the directed migration, of mesenchymal cells. Platelet-derived growth factor is a dimeric glycoprotein that can be composed of two A subunits (PDGF-AA), two B subunits (PDGF-BB), or one of each (PDGF-AB).

PDGF is a potent mitogen for cells of mesenchymal origin, including fibroblasts, smooth muscle cells and glial cells. In both mouse and human, the PDGF signalling network consists of five ligands, PDGF-AA through -DD (including -AB), and two receptors, PDGFRalpha and PDGFRbeta. All PDGFs function as secreted, disulphide-linked homodimers, but only PDGFA and B can form functional heterodimers.

Though PDGF is synthesized, stored (in the alpha granules of platelets), and released by platelets upon activation, it is also produced by other cells including smooth muscle cells, activated macrophages, and endothelial cells.

Recombinant PDGF is used in medicine to help heal chronic ulcers, to heal ocular surface diseases and in orthopedic surgery and periodontics as an alternative to bone autograft to stimulate bone regeneration and repair.

== Types and classification ==
There are five different isoforms of PDGF that activate cellular response through two different receptors. Known ligands include: PDGF-AA (PDGFA), -BB (PDGFB), -CC (PDGFC), and -DD (PDGFD), and -AB (a PDGFA and PDGFB heterodimer). The ligands interact with the two tyrosine kinase receptor monomers, PDGFRα (PDGFRA) and -Rβ (PDGFRB). The PDGF family also includes a few other members of the family, including the VEGF sub-family.

== Mechanisms ==
The receptor for PDGF, PDGFR is classified as a receptor tyrosine kinase (RTK), a type of cell surface receptor. Two types of PDGFRs have been identified: alpha-type and beta-type PDGFRs. The alpha type binds to PDGF-AA, PDGF-BB and PDGF-AB, whereas the beta type PDGFR binds with high affinity to PDGF-BB and PDGF-AB. PDGF binds to the PDGFR ligand binding pocket located within the second and third immunoglobulin domains. Upon activation by PDGF, these receptors dimerise, and are "switched on" by auto-phosphorylation of several sites on their cytosolic domains, which serve to mediate binding of cofactors and subsequently activate signal transduction, for example, through the PI3K pathway or through reactive oxygen species (ROS)-mediated activation of the STAT3 pathway. Downstream effects of this include regulation of gene expression and the cell cycle. The role of PI3K has been investigated by several laboratories. Accumulating data suggests that, while this molecule is, in general, part of growth signaling complex, it plays a more profound role in controlling cell migration. The different ligand isoforms have variable affinities for the receptor isoforms, and the receptor isoforms may variably form hetero- or homo- dimers. This leads to specificity of downstream signaling. It has been shown that the sis oncogene is derived from the PDGF B-chain gene. PDGF-BB is the highest-affinity ligand for the PDGFR-beta; PDGFR-beta is a key marker of hepatic stellate cell activation in the process of fibrogenesis.

== Function ==
PDGFs are mitogenic during early developmental stages, driving the proliferation of undifferentiated mesenchyme and some progenitor populations. During later maturation stages, PDGF signalling has been implicated in tissue remodelling and cellular differentiation, and in inductive events involved in patterning and morphogenesis. In addition to driving mesenchymal proliferation, PDGFs have been shown to direct the migration, differentiation and function of a variety of specialised mesenchymal and migratory cell types, both during development and in the adult animal. Other growth factors in this family include vascular endothelial growth factors B and C (VEGF-B, VEGF-C) which are active in angiogenesis and endothelial cell growth, and placenta growth factor (PlGF) which is also active in angiogenesis.

PDGF plays a role in embryonic development, cell proliferation, cell migration, and angiogenesis. Over-expression of PDGF has been linked to several diseases such as atherosclerosis, fibrotic disorders and malignancies. Synthesis occurs due to external stimuli such as thrombin, low oxygen tension, or other cytokines and growth factors.

PDGF is a required element in cellular division for fibroblasts, a type of connective tissue cell that is especially prevalent in wound healing. In essence, the PDGFs allow a cell to skip the G1 checkpoints in order to divide. It has been shown that in monocytes-macrophages and fibroblasts, exogenously administered PDGF stimulates chemotaxis, proliferation, and gene expression and significantly augmented the influx of inflammatory cells and fibroblasts, accelerating extracellular matrix and collagen formation and thus reducing the time for the healing process to occur.

In terms of osteogenic differentiation of mesenchymal stem cells, comparing PDGF to epidermal growth factor (EGF), which is also implicated in stimulating cell growth, proliferation, and differentiation, MSCs were shown to have stronger osteogenic differentiation into bone-forming cells when stimulated by epidermal growth factor (EGF) versus PDGF. However, comparing the signaling pathways between them reveals that the PI3K pathway is exclusively activated by PDGF, with EGF having no effect. Chemically inhibiting the PI3K pathway in PDGF-stimulated cells negates the differential effect between the two growth factors, and actually gives PDGF an edge in osteogenic differentiation. Wortmannin is a PI3K-specific inhibitor, and treatment of cells with Wortmannin in combination with PDGF resulted in enhanced osteoblast differentiation compared to just PDGF alone, as well as compared to EGF. These results indicate that the addition of Wortmannin can significantly increase the response of cells into an osteogenic lineage in the presence of PDGF, and thus might reduce the need for higher concentrations of PDGF or other growth factors, making PDGF a more viable growth factor for osteogenic differentiation than other, more expensive growth factors currently used in the field such as BMP2.

PDGF is also known to maintain proliferation of oligodendrocyte progenitor cells (OPCs). It has also been shown that fibroblast growth factor (FGF) activates a signaling pathway that positively regulates the PDGF receptors in OPCs.

== History ==
PDGF was one of the first growth factors characterized, and has led to an understanding of the mechanism of many growth factor signaling pathways.The first engineered dominant negative protein was designed to inhibit PDGF

== Medicine ==
Recombinant PDGF is used to help heal chronic ulcers and in orthopedic surgery and periodontics to stimulate bone regeneration and repair. PDGF may be beneficial when used by itself or especially in combination with other growth factors to stimulate soft and hard tissue healing (Lynch et al. 1987, 1989, 1991, 1995).

== Research ==
Like many other growth factors that have been linked to disease, PDGF and its receptors have provided a market for receptor antagonists to treat disease. Such antagonists include (but are not limited to) specific antibodies that target the molecule of interest, which act only in a neutralizing manner.

The "c-Sis" oncogene is derived from PDGF.

Age related downregulation of the PDGF receptor on islet beta cells has been demonstrated to prevent islet beta cell proliferation in both animal and human cells and its re-expression triggered beta cell proliferation and corrected glucose regulation via insulin secretion.

A non-viral PDGF "bio patch" can regenerate missing or damaged bone by delivering DNA in a nano-sized particle directly into cells via genes. Repairing bone fractures, fixing craniofacial defects and improving dental implants are among potential uses. The patch employs a collagen platform seeded with particles containing the genes needed for producing bone. In experiments, new bone fully covered skull wounds in test animals and stimulated growth in human bone marrow stromal cells.

The addition of PDGF at specific time‐points has been shown to stabilise vasculature in collagen‐glycosaminoglycan scaffolds.

== Family members ==
Human genes encoding proteins that belong to the platelet-derived growth factor family include:

- PDGFA; PDGFB; PDGFC; PDGFD
- PGF
- VEGF; VEGFB; VEGFC; VEGFD

== See also ==
- Platelet-activating factor
- Platelet-derived growth factor receptor
- atheroma platelet involvement in smooth muscle proliferation
- Withaferin A potent inhibitor of angiogenesis
