= PDGFC =

Protein-coding gene in the species Homo sapiens

Identifiers
- Aliases: PDGFC, FALLOTEIN, SCDGF, platelet derived growth factor C
- External IDs: OMIM: 608452; MGI: 1859631; GeneCards: PDGFC

Gene location (Human)
Chr.	Chromosome 4 (human)
Band	4q32.1	Start	156,760,454 bp
Band	4q32.1	End	156,971,799 bp

Gene location (Mouse)
Chr.	Chromosome 3 (mouse)
Band	3|3 E3	Start	80,943,723 bp
Band	3|3 E3	End	81,121,347 bp
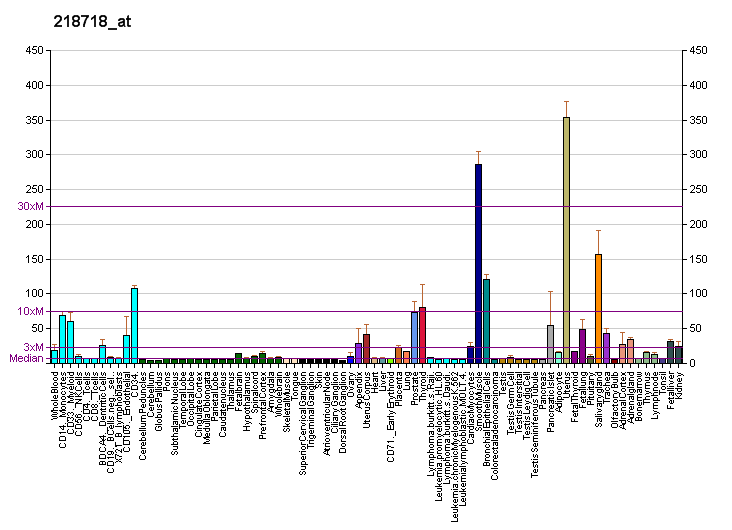

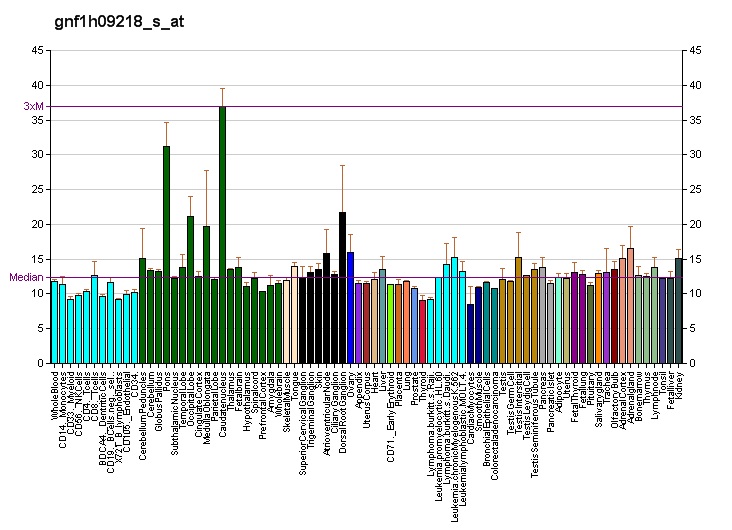
RNA expression pattern
Bgee	Human / Mouse (ortholog); Top expressed in: parotid gland; germinal epithelium; tibia; parietal pleura; periodontal fiber; skin of hip; kidney tubule; metanephric glomerulus; seminal vesicula; stromal cell of endometrium / Top expressed in: gastrula; vas deferens; efferent ductule; calvaria; internal carotid artery; tunica media of zone of aorta; renal corpuscle; vestibular sensory epithelium; stroma of bone marrow; abdominal wall; More reference expression data
BioGPS	More reference expression data
Gene ontology
Molecular function	protein homodimerization activity; protein binding; growth factor activity; platelet-derived growth factor receptor binding
Cellular component	Golgi membrane; nucleus; extracellular region; endoplasmic reticulum lumen; membrane; cell surface; extracellular exosome; plasma membrane; extracellular space; cytoplasm; cytosol
Biological process	positive regulation of ERK1 and ERK2 cascade; cellular response to amino acid stimulus; positive regulation of cell population proliferation; bone development; positive regulation of protein autophosphorylation; positive regulation of phosphatidylinositol 3-kinase signaling; multicellular organism development; activation of transmembrane receptor protein tyrosine kinase activity; central nervous system development; embryo development; positive regulation of cell division; positive regulation of cell migration; positive regulation of DNA replication; positive regulation of MAP kinase activity; animal organ morphogenesis; digestive tract development; regulation of peptidyl-tyrosine phosphorylation; positive regulation of fibroblast proliferation; platelet-derived growth factor receptor signaling pathway; blood coagulation; regulation of signaling receptor activity; embryonic organ development; positive regulation of cold-induced thermogenesis
Sources:Amigo / QuickGO
Orthologs
Databases	NCBI: entry; OMA: entry
Species	Human	Mouse
Entrez	56034	54635
Ensembl	ENSG00000145431	ENSMUSG00000028019
UniProt	Q9NRA1	Q8CI19
RefSeq (mRNA)	NM_016205	NM_019971; NM_001357746
RefSeq (protein)	NP_057289	NP_064355; NP_001344675
Location (UCSC)	Chr 4: 156.76 – 156.97 Mb	Chr 3: 80.94 – 81.12 Mb
PubMed search
- Wikidata
View/Edit Human	View/Edit Mouse

Platelet-derived growth factor C, also known as PDGF-C, is a 345-amino acid protein that in humans is encoded by the PDGFC gene. Platelet-derived growth factors are important in connective tissue growth, survival and function, and consist of disulphide-linked dimers involving two polypeptide chains, PDGF-A and PDGF-B. PDGF-C is a member of the PDGF/VEGF family of growth factors with a unique two-domain structure and expression pattern. PDGF-C was not previously identified with PDGF-A and PDGF-B, possibly because it may be that it is synthesized and secreted as a latent growth factor, requiring proteolytic removal of the N-terminal CUB domain for receptor binding and activation.

== Function ==
The protein encoded by this gene is a member of the platelet-derived growth factor family. The four members of this family are mitogenic factors for cells of mesenchymal origin and are characterized by a core motif of eight cysteines. This gene product appears to form only homodimers. It differs from the platelet-derived growth factor alpha and beta polypeptides in having an unusual N-terminal domain, the CUB domain.

PDGF-C is a key component of the PDGFR-α signaling pathway and has a specific role in palatogenesis and the morphogenesis of the integumentary tissue. The phenotypes of compound mutants imply that PDGF-C and PDGF-A may function as principal ligands for PDGFR-α.

Mouse knockout studies show that PDGF-C is required for palatogenesis. Although human studies support an etiologic role for several genes in cleft lip and palate etiology (PVRL1, IRF6, and MSX1), expression levels of the mouse homologs of these genes were unaltered in Pdgfc−/− mutant embryos that develop clefts, suggesting that their activity is not related to PDGF-C signaling in palatogenesis, so PDGF-C signaling is a new pathway in palatogenesis.

== Interactions ==
PDGFC has been shown to interact with PDGFRA.

PDGF-C is a latent growth factor with proteolytic activation, and the processing enzyme might be controlled by the other CLP-associated genes that may indirectly connect to PDGF-C signaling. Notably, a 30-cM region on human chromosome 4, where the PDGFC gene maps, shows strong linkage association with CLP26, and clinical genetic data further suggest a potential link between PDGFC gene polymorphism and cleft lip and palate.
