= Hennekam syndrome =

- Other names: Hennekam lymphangiectasia–lymphedema syndrome, intestinal lymphagiectasia–lymphedema–mental retardation syndrome
- Hennekam syndrome is inherited in an autosomal recessive manner
- Differential diagnosis: Kabuki syndrome Osteopathia striata with cranial sclerosis
- Frequency: 0.0001%

Hennekam syndrome, also known as intestinal lymphagiectasia–lymphedema–mental retardation syndrome, is an autosomal recessive disorder consisting of intestinal lymphangiectasia, facial anomalies, peripheral lymphedema, and mild to moderate levels of growth and intellectual disability.

It is also known as "lymphedema-lymphangiectasia-mental retardation syndrome".

Hennekam syndrome is subdivided according to the causative genetic lesion, most (or all) of which are affecting the VEGF-C/VEGFR-3 signaling pathway:

- Type 1 (mutations in CCBE1)
- Type 2 (mutations in FAT4)
- Type 3 (mutations in ADAMTS3)

The first recognition of a genetic association was with CCBE1, published by its namesake, Raoul Hennekam. The molecular mechanism of the lymphedema phenotype in CCBE1-associated cases was identified as a diminished ability of the mutated CCBE1 to accelerate and focus the activation of the primary lymphangiogenic growth factor VEGF-C. Mutations in the FAT4 gene had previously been only associated with van Maldergem syndrome, but the pathogenetic molecular mechanism and the function of FAT4 within lymphangiogenesis are still unknown.
