= Vascular endothelial growth factor =

Protein involved in blood vessel growth

Vascular endothelial growth factor (VEGF, /vɛdʒˈɛf/), originally known as vascular permeability factor (VPF), is a signal protein produced by many cells that stimulates the formation of blood vessels. To be specific, VEGF is a sub-family of growth factors, the platelet-derived growth factor family of cystine-knot growth factors. They are important signaling proteins involved in both vasculogenesis (the de novo formation of the embryonic circulatory system) and angiogenesis (the growth of blood vessels from pre-existing vasculature).

It is part of the system that restores the oxygen supply to tissues when blood circulation is inadequate such as in hypoxic conditions. Serum concentration of VEGF is high in bronchial asthma and diabetes mellitus. VEGF's normal function is to create new blood vessels during embryonic development, new blood vessels after injury, muscle following exercise, and new vessels (collateral circulation) to bypass blocked vessels. It can contribute to disease. Solid cancers cannot grow beyond a limited size without an adequate blood supply; cancers that can express VEGF are able to grow and metastasize. Overexpression of VEGF can cause vascular disease in the retina of the eye and other parts of the body. Drugs such as aflibercept, bevacizumab, ranibizumab, and pegaptanib can inhibit VEGF and control or slow those diseases.

== History ==
In 1970, Judah Folkman et al. described a factor secreted by tumors causing angiogenesis and called it tumor angiogenesis factor. In 1983 Senger et al. identified a vascular permeability factor secreted by tumors in guinea pigs and hamsters. In 1989 Ferrara and Henzel described an identical factor in bovine pituitary follicular cells which they purified, cloned and named VEGF. A similar VEGF alternative splicing was discovered by Tischer et al. in 1991. Between 1996 and 1997, Christinger and De Vos obtained the crystal structure of VEGF, first at 2.5 Å resolution and later at 1.9 Å.

Fms-like tyrosine kinase-1 (flt-1) was shown to be a VEGF receptor by Ferrara et al. in 1992. The kinase insert domain receptor (KDR) was shown to be a VEGF receptor by Terman et al. in 1992 as well. In 1998, neuropilin 1 and neuropilin 2 were shown to act as VEGF receptors.

== Classification ==
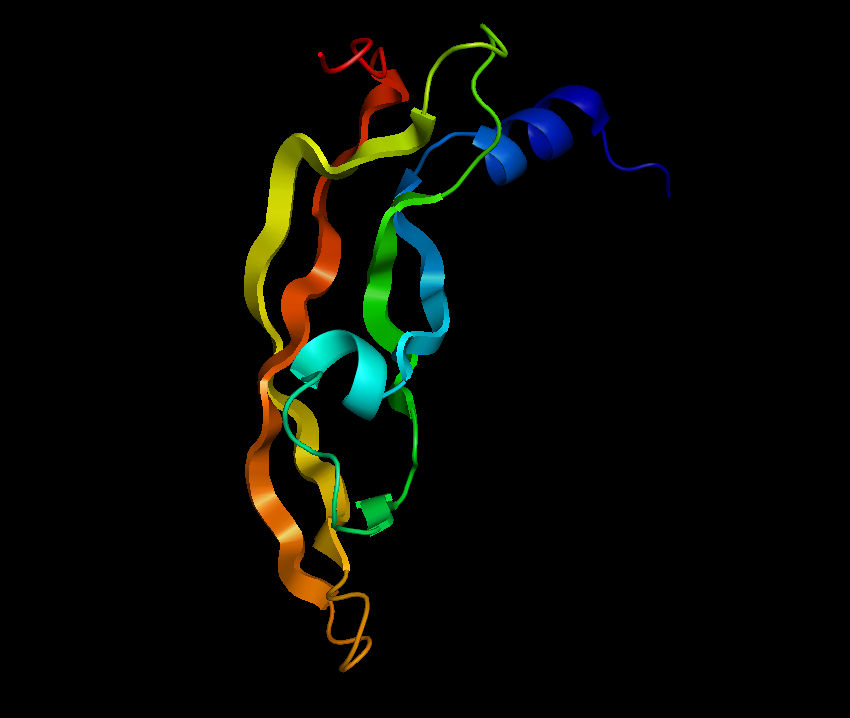
Crystal structure of Vammin, a VEGF-F from a snake venom

In mammals, the VEGF family comprises five members: VEGF-A, placenta growth factor (PGF), VEGF-B, VEGF-C and VEGF-D. The latter members were discovered after VEGF-A; before their discovery, VEGF-A was known as VEGF. A number of VEGF-related proteins encoded by viruses (VEGF-E) and in the venom of some snakes (VEGF-F) have also been discovered.

VEGF family
Type	Function
VEGF-A	Angiogenesis; ↑ Migration of endothelial cells; ↑ mitosis of endothelial cells; ↑ Matrix metalloproteinase activity; ↑ αvβ3 activity; ↑ Migration and proliferation of Astrocytes; creation of blood vessel lumen; creates fenestrations; Chemotactic for macrophages and granulocytes; Vasodilation (indirectly by NO release); Lymphangiogenesis
VEGF-B	Embryonic angiogenesis (myocardial tissue, to be specific)
VEGF-C	Lymphangiogenesis
VEGF-D	Needed for the development of lymphatic vasculature surrounding lung bronchioles
PlGF	Important for Vasculogenesis, Also needed for angiogenesis during ischemia, inflammation, wound healing, and cancer.

Activity of VEGF-A, as its name implies, has been studied mostly on cells of the vascular endothelium, although it does have effects on a number of other cell types (e.g., stimulation monocyte/macrophage migration, neurons, cancer cells, kidney epithelial cells). In vitro, VEGF-A has been shown to stimulate endothelial cell mitogenesis and cell migration. VEGF-A is also a vasodilator and increases microvascular permeability and was originally referred to as vascular permeability factor.

== Isoforms ==
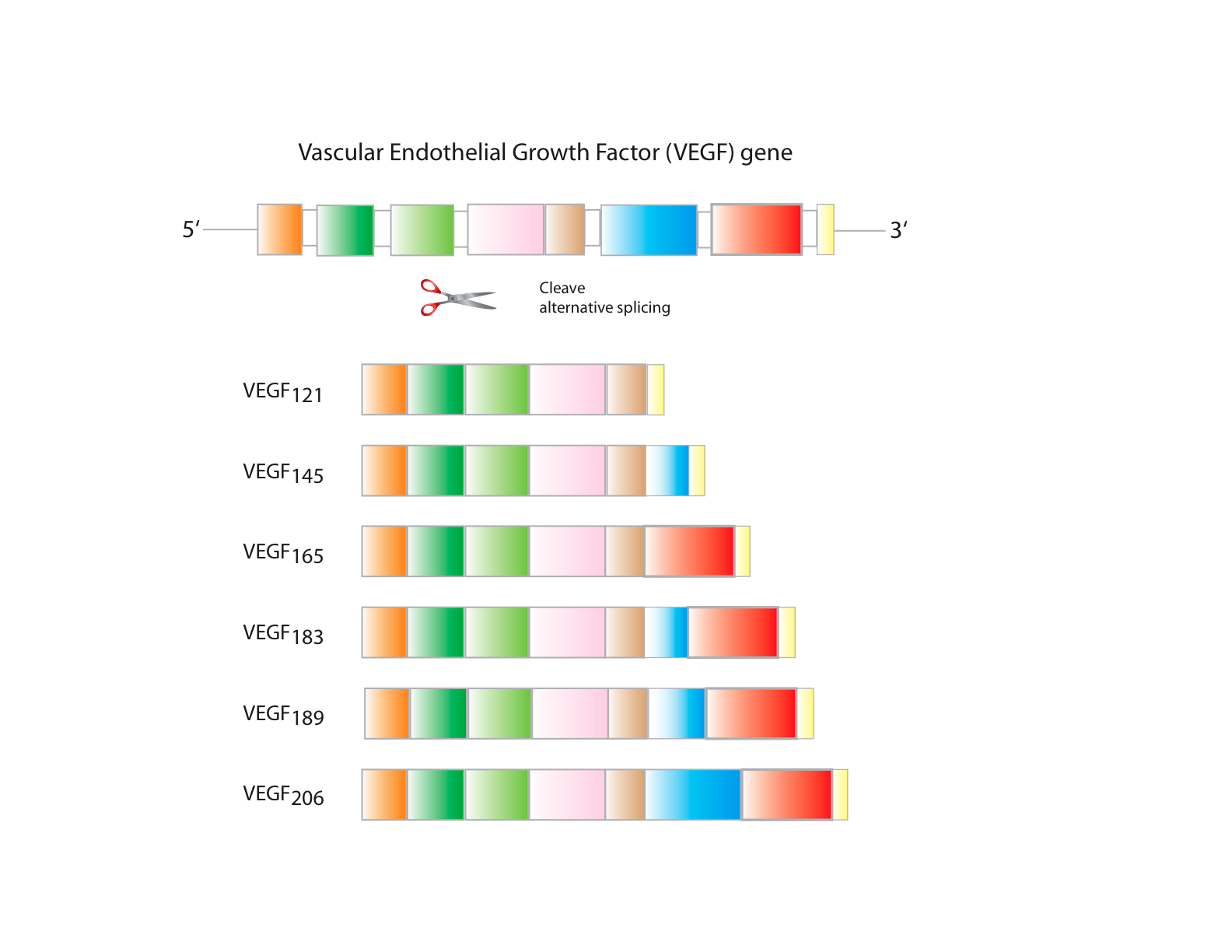
Schematic representation of the different isoforms of human VEGF

There are multiple isoforms of VEGF-A that result from alternative splicing of mRNA from a single, 8-exon VEGFA gene. These are classified into two groups which are referred to according to their terminal exon (exon 8) splice site: the proximal splice site (denoted VEGF_{xxx}) or distal splice site (VEGF_{xxx}b). In addition, alternate splicing of exon 6 and 7 alters their heparin-binding affinity and amino acid number (in humans: VEGF_{121}, VEGF_{121}b, VEGF_{145}, VEGF_{165}, VEGF_{165}b, VEGF_{189}, VEGF_{206}; the rodent orthologs of these proteins contain one fewer amino acids). These domains have important functional consequences for the VEGF splice variants, as the terminal (exon 8) splice site determines whether the proteins are pro-angiogenic (proximal splice site, expressed during angiogenesis) or anti-angiogenic (distal splice site, expressed in normal tissues). In addition, inclusion or exclusion of exons 6 and 7 mediate interactions with heparan sulfate proteoglycans (HSPGs) and neuropilin co-receptors on the cell surface, enhancing their ability to bind and activate the VEGF receptors (VEGFRs). Recently, VEGF-C has been shown to be an important inducer of neurogenesis in the murine subventricular zone, without exerting angiogenic effects.

== Mechanism ==
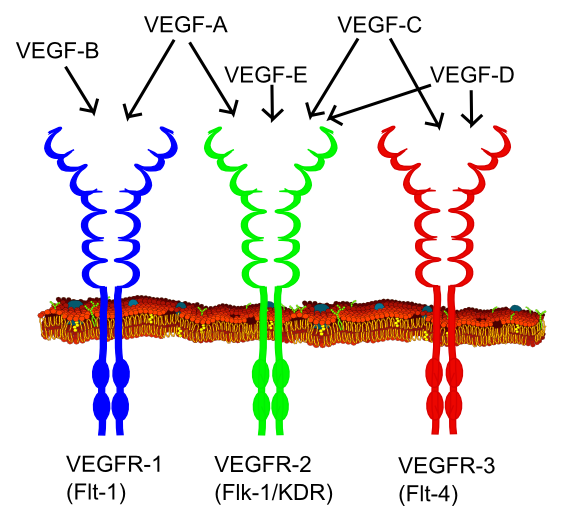
Types of VEGF and their VEGF receptors.

All members of the VEGF family stimulate cellular responses by binding to tyrosine kinase receptors (the VEGFRs) on the cell surface, causing them to dimerize and become activated through transphosphorylation, although to different sites, times, and extents. The VEGF receptors have an extracellular portion consisting of 7 immunoglobulin-like domains, a single transmembrane spanning region, and an intracellular portion containing a split tyrosine-kinase domain. VEGF-A binds to VEGFR-1 (Flt-1) and VEGFR-2 (KDR/Flk-1). VEGFR-2 appears to mediate almost all of the known cellular responses to VEGF. The function of VEGFR-1 is less well-defined, although it is thought to modulate VEGFR-2 signaling. Another function of VEGFR-1 may be to act as a dummy/decoy receptor, sequestering VEGF from VEGFR-2 binding (this appears to be particularly important during vasculogenesis in the embryo). VEGF-C and VEGF-D, but not VEGF-A, are ligands for a third receptor (VEGFR-3/Flt4), which mediates lymphangiogenesis. The receptor (VEGFR3) is the site of binding of main ligands (VEGFC and VEGFD), which mediates perpetual action and function of ligands on target cells. Vascular endothelial growth factor-C can stimulate lymphangiogenesis (via VEGFR3) and angiogenesis via VEGFR2. Vascular endothelial growth factor-R3 has been detected in lymphatic endothelial cells in CL of many species, cattle, buffalo and primate.

In addition to binding to VEGFRs, VEGF binds to receptor complexes consisting of both neuropilins and VEGFRs. This receptor complex has increased VEGF signalling activity in endothelial cells (blood vessels). Neuropilins (NRP) are pleiotropic receptors and therefore other molecules may interfere with the signalling of the NRP/VEGFR receptor complexes. For example, Class 3 semaphorins compete with VEGF_{165} for NRP binding and could therefore regulate VEGF-mediated angiogenesis.

== Expression ==
VEGF-A production can be induced in a cell that is not receiving enough oxygen. When a cell is deficient in oxygen, it produces HIF, hypoxia-inducible factor, a transcription factor. HIF stimulates the release of VEGF-A, among other functions (including modulation of erythropoiesis). Circulating VEGF-A then binds to VEGF receptors on endothelial cells, triggering a tyrosine kinase pathway leading to angiogenesis. The expression of angiopoietin-2 in the absence of VEGF leads to endothelial cell death and vascular regression. Conversely, a German study done in vivo found that VEGF concentrations actually decreased after a 25% reduction in oxygen intake for 30 minutes. HIF1 alpha and HIF1 beta are constantly being produced but HIF1 alpha is highly O_{2} labile, so, in aerobic conditions, it is degraded. When the cell becomes hypoxic, HIF1 alpha persists and the HIF1alpha/beta complex stimulates VEGF release. The combined use of microvesicles and 5-FU resulted in enhanced chemosensitivity of squamous cell carcinoma cells more than the use of either 5-FU or microvesicle alone. In addition, down regulation of VEGF gene expression was associated with decreased CD1 gene expression.

== Clinical significance ==
=== In disease ===
VEGF-A and the corresponding receptors are rapidly up-regulated after traumatic injury of the central nervous system (CNS). VEGF-A is highly expressed in the acute and sub-acute stages of CNS injury, but the protein expression declines over time. This time-span of VEGF-A expression corresponds with the endogenous re-vascularization capacity after injury. This would suggest that VEGF-A / VEGF_{165} could be used as target to promote angiogenesis after traumatic CNS injuries. However, there are contradicting scientific reports about the effects of VEGF-A treatments in CNS injury models.

Although it has not been associated as a biomarker for the diagnosis of acute ischemic stroke, high levels of serum VEGF in the first 48 hours after a cerebral infarct have been associated with a poor prognosis after 6 months and 2 years.

VEGF-A has been implicated with poor prognosis in breast cancer. Numerous studies show a decreased overall survival and disease-free survival in those tumors overexpressing VEGF. The overexpression of VEGF-A may be an early step in the process of metastasis, a step that is involved in the "angiogenic" switch. Although VEGF-A has been correlated with poor survival, its exact mechanism of action in the progression of tumors remains unclear.

VEGF-A is also released in rheumatoid arthritis in response to TNF-α, increasing endothelial permeability and swelling and also stimulating angiogenesis (formation of capillaries).

VEGF-A is also important in diabetic retinopathy (DR). The microcirculatory problems in the retina of people with diabetes can cause retinal ischaemia, which results in the release of VEGF-A, and a switch in the balance of pro-angiogenic VEGF_{xxx} isoforms over the normally expressed VEGF_{xxx}b isoforms. VEGF_{xxx} may then cause the creation of new blood vessels in the retina and elsewhere in the eye, heralding changes that may threaten the sight.

VEGF-A plays a role in the disease pathology of the wet form age-related macular degeneration (AMD), which is the leading cause of blindness for the elderly of the industrialized world. The vascular pathology of AMD shares certain similarities with diabetic retinopathy, although the cause of disease and the typical source of neovascularization differs between the two diseases.

VEGF-D serum levels are significantly elevated in patients with angiosarcoma.

Once released, VEGF-A may elicit several responses. It may cause a cell to survive, move, or further differentiate. Hence, VEGF is a potential target for the treatment of cancer. The first anti-VEGF drug, a monoclonal antibody named bevacizumab, was approved in 2004. Approximately 10–15% of patients benefit from bevacizumab therapy; however, biomarkers for bevacizumab efficacy are not yet known.

Current studies show that VEGFs are not the only promoters of angiogenesis. In particular, FGF2 and HGF are potent angiogenic factors.

Patients suffering from pulmonary emphysema have been found to have decreased levels of VEGF in the pulmonary arteries.

VEGF-D has also been shown to be over expressed in lymphangioleiomyomatosis and is currently used as a diagnostic biomarker in the treatment of this rare disease.

In the kidney, increased expression of VEGF-A in glomeruli directly causes the glomerular hypertrophy that is associated with proteinuria.

VEGF alterations can be predictive of early-onset pre-eclampsia.

Gene therapies for refractory angina establish expression of VEGF in epicardial cells to promote angiogenesis.

== See also ==
- Proteases in angiogenesis
- Withaferin A, a potent inhibitor of angiogenesis
