= Therapeutic angiogenesis =

Experimental treatment

Therapeutic angiogenesis is an experimental area in the treatment of ischemia, the condition associated with decrease in blood supply to certain organs, tissues, or body parts. This is usually caused by constriction or obstruction of the blood vessels. Angiogenesis is the natural healing process by which new blood vessels are formed to supply the organ or part in deficit with oxygen-rich blood. The goal of therapeutic angiogenesis is to stimulate the creation of new blood vessels in ischemic organs, tissues, or parts with the hope of increasing the level of oxygen-rich blood reaching these areas.

== See also ==
- Vascular endothelial growth factor
