= PDGFD =

Protein-coding gene in the species Homo sapiens

Identifiers
- Aliases: PDGFD, IEGF, SCDGF-B, SCDGFB, MSTP036, platelet derived growth factor D
- External IDs: OMIM: 609673; MGI: 1919035; GeneCards: PDGFD

Gene location (Human)
Chr.	Chromosome 11 (human)
Band	11q22.3	Start	103,907,189 bp
Band	11q22.3	End	104,164,379 bp

Gene location (Mouse)
Chr.	Chromosome 9 (mouse)
Band	9|9 A1	Start	6,168,584 bp
Band	9|9 A1	End	6,378,850 bp
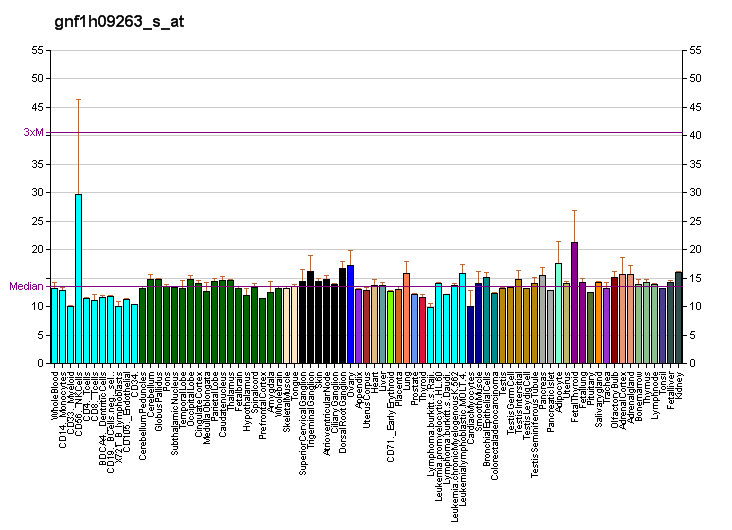

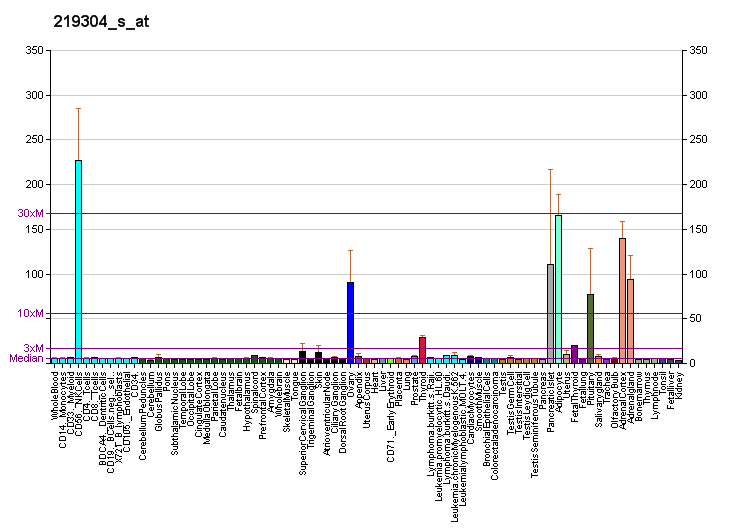
RNA expression pattern
Bgee	Human / Mouse (ortholog); Top expressed in: periodontal fiber; germinal epithelium; seminal vesicula; adrenal cortex; ventricular zone; left adrenal cortex; synovial joint; right adrenal cortex; Descending thoracic aorta; ascending aorta / Top expressed in: interventricular septum; ascending aorta; facial motor nucleus; Epithelium of choroid plexus; aortic valve; body of femur; calvaria; iris; vestibular sensory epithelium; anterior horn of spinal cord; More reference expression data
BioGPS	More reference expression data
Gene ontology
Molecular function	platelet-derived growth factor receptor binding; growth factor activity
Cellular component	endoplasmic reticulum lumen; membrane; Golgi membrane; extracellular region; extracellular space
Biological process	cellular response to transforming growth factor beta stimulus; positive regulation of smooth muscle cell chemotaxis; positive regulation of MAP kinase activity; positive regulation of fibroblast proliferation; positive regulation of cell migration; cellular response to platelet-derived growth factor stimulus; multicellular organism development; positive regulation of monocyte extravasation; positive regulation of protein autophosphorylation; positive regulation of cell population proliferation; positive regulation of ERK1 and ERK2 cascade; cellular response to amino acid stimulus; positive regulation of phosphatidylinositol 3-kinase signaling; platelet-derived growth factor receptor signaling pathway; positive regulation of glomerular mesangial cell proliferation; positive regulation of cell division; positive regulation of smooth muscle cell proliferation; cellular response to hydrogen peroxide; regulation of peptidyl-tyrosine phosphorylation; blood coagulation; regulation of signaling receptor activity
Sources:Amigo / QuickGO
Orthologs
Databases	NCBI: entry; OMA: entry
Species	Human	Mouse
Entrez	80310	71785
Ensembl	ENSG00000170962	ENSMUSG00000032006
UniProt	Q9GZP0	Q925I7
RefSeq (mRNA)	NM_033135; NM_025208	NM_027924; NM_001357397; NM_001357398
RefSeq (protein)	NP_079484; NP_149126	NP_082200; NP_001344326; NP_001344327
Location (UCSC)	Chr 11: 103.91 – 104.16 Mb	Chr 9: 6.17 – 6.38 Mb
PubMed search
- Wikidata
View/Edit Human	View/Edit Mouse

Platelet-derived growth factor D is a protein that in humans is encoded by the PDGFD gene.

The protein encoded by this gene is a member of the platelet-derived growth factor family. The four members of this family are mitogenic factors for cells of mesenchymal origin and are characterized by a core motif of eight cysteines, seven of which are found in this factor. This gene product only forms homodimers and, therefore, does not dimerize with the other three family members. It differs from alpha and beta members of this family in having an unusual N-terminal domain, the CUB domain. Two splice variants have been identified for this gene.
