= CCBE1 =

Protein-coding gene in humans

Identifiers
- Aliases: CCBE1, HKLLS1, collagen and calcium binding EGF domains 1
- External IDs: OMIM: 612753; MGI: 2445053; GeneCards: CCBE1

Gene location (Human)
Chr.	Chromosome 18 (human)
Band	18q21.32	Start	59,430,939 bp
Band	18q21.32	End	59,697,662 bp

Gene location (Mouse)
Chr.	Chromosome 18 (mouse)
Band	18|18 E1	Start	66,178,373 bp
Band	18|18 E1	End	66,435,812 bp
RNA expression pattern
Bgee	Human / Mouse (ortholog); Top expressed in: secondary oocyte; lower lobe of lung; buccal mucosa cell; muscle layer of sigmoid colon; left ovary; right lung; left adrenal gland; left adrenal cortex; germinal epithelium; stromal cell of endometrium / Top expressed in: pericardium; pericardial cavity; endothelial cell of lymphatic vessel; anterior cardinal vein; septum transversum; epithelium of lens; prostate; retinal pigment epithelium; lumbar subsegment of spinal cord; lobe of prostate; More reference expression data
BioGPS	n/a
Gene ontology
Molecular function	protease binding; calcium ion binding; protein binding; collagen binding
Cellular component	extracellular region; collagen; extracellular space; extracellular matrix
Biological process	positive regulation of endothelial cell migration; multicellular organism development; positive regulation of vascular endothelial growth factor production; sprouting angiogenesis; positive regulation of lymphangiogenesis; positive regulation of protein processing; angiogenesis; positive regulation of vascular endothelial growth factor signaling pathway; venous blood vessel morphogenesis; lymphangiogenesis; positive regulation of angiogenesis; lymph vessel development; lung development; respiratory gaseous exchange by respiratory system; respiratory system process
Sources:Amigo / QuickGO
Orthologs
Databases	NCBI: entry; OMA: entry
Species	Human	Mouse
Entrez	147372	320924
Ensembl	ENSG00000183287	ENSMUSG00000046318
UniProt	Q6UXH8	Q3MI99
RefSeq (mRNA)	NM_133459	NM_178793
RefSeq (protein)	NP_597716	NP_848908
Location (UCSC)	Chr 18: 59.43 – 59.7 Mb	Chr 18: 66.18 – 66.44 Mb
PubMed search
- Wikidata
View/Edit Human	View/Edit Mouse

Collagen and calcium-binding EGF domain-containing protein 1 is a protein that in humans is encoded by the CCBE1 gene.

== Function ==
CCBE1 is a regulator of the development and growth of the lymphatic system. CCBE1 is necessary for the proteolytic activation of VEGF-C by ADAMTS3, which is the main growth factor for the lymphatic system.

== Clinical significance ==
Hennekam syndrome type I (a generalized lymphatic dysplasia in humans) is associated with mutations in the CCBE1 gene, and the molecular etiology of the disease has been elucidated.
