= SHC2 =

Protein-coding gene in the species Homo sapiens

Identifiers
- Aliases: SHC2, SCK, SHCB, SLI, SHC adaptor protein 2
- External IDs: OMIM: 605217; MGI: 106180; GeneCards: SHC2

Gene location (Human)
Chr.	Chromosome 19 (human)
Band	19p13.3	Start	416,589 bp
Band	19p13.3	End	461,033 bp

Gene location (Mouse)
Chr.	Chromosome 10 (mouse)
Band	10 C1|10 39.72 cM	Start	79,453,885 bp
Band	10 C1|10 39.72 cM	End	79,473,752 bp
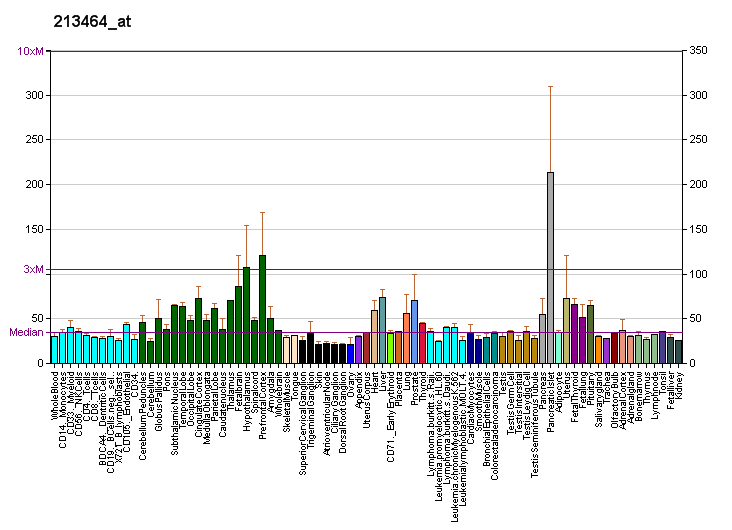
RNA expression pattern
Bgee	Human / Mouse (ortholog); Top expressed in: body of pancreas; anterior pituitary; right lobe of liver; right uterine tube; gastric mucosa; apex of heart; right frontal lobe; left lobe of thyroid gland; right lobe of thyroid gland; amygdala / Top expressed in: superior cervical ganglion; lumbar spinal ganglion; primary visual cortex; superior frontal gyrus; dentate gyrus of hippocampal formation granule cell; neural tube; genital tubercle; muscle of thigh; tail of embryo; humerus; More reference expression data
BioGPS	More reference expression data
Gene ontology
Molecular function	protein binding; receptor tyrosine kinase binding
Cellular component	cytosol; plasma membrane; cellular component
Biological process	Ras protein signal transduction; vascular endothelial growth factor receptor signaling pathway; MAPK cascade; transmembrane receptor protein tyrosine kinase signaling pathway; intracellular signal transduction
Sources:Amigo / QuickGO
Orthologs
Databases	NCBI: entry; OMA: entry
Species	Human	Mouse
Entrez	25759	216148
Ensembl	ENSG00000129946	ENSMUSG00000020312
UniProt	P98077	Q8BMC3
RefSeq (mRNA)	NM_012435; NM_001387056	NM_001024539
RefSeq (protein)	NP_036567	NP_001019710
Location (UCSC)	Chr 19: 0.42 – 0.46 Mb	Chr 10: 79.45 – 79.47 Mb
PubMed search
- Wikidata
View/Edit Human	View/Edit Mouse

SHC-transforming protein 2 is a protein that in humans is encoded by the SHC2 gene.

== Interactions ==
SHC2 has been shown to interact with Kinase insert domain receptor.
