= VEGF receptor =

Protein family

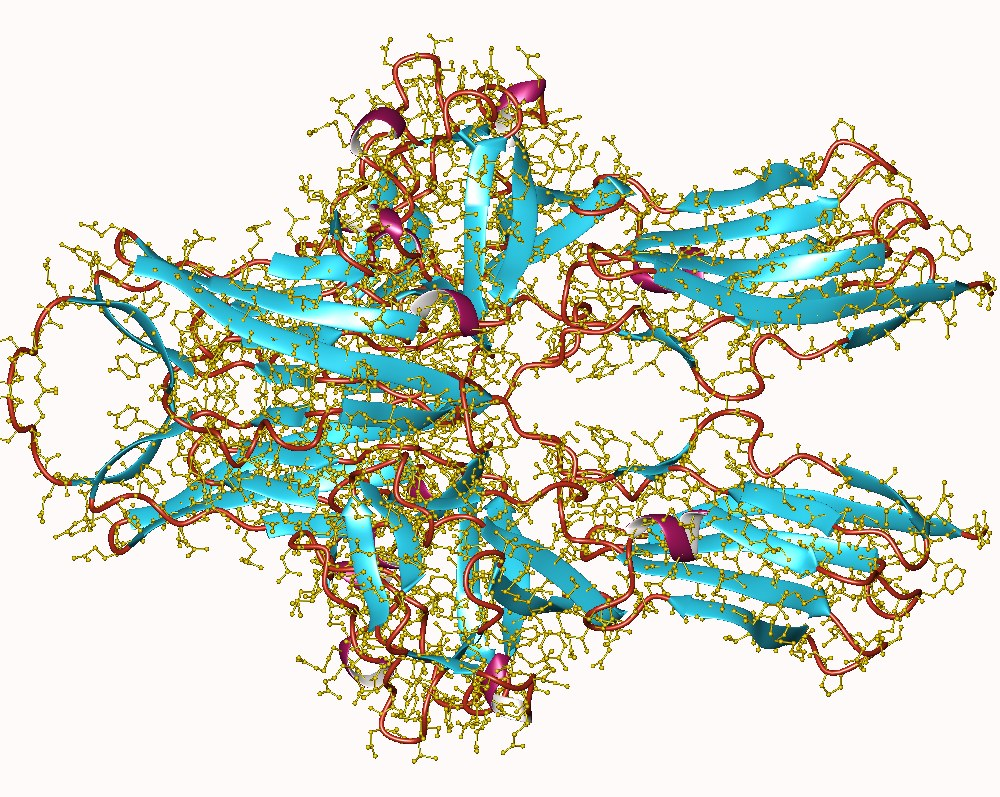
- fms-related tyrosine kinase 1 (vascular endothelial growth factor/vascular permeability factor receptor)

Identifiers
- Symbol: VEGF
- InterPro: IPR009135
- Membranome: 1335
Available protein structures:
- PDB: IPR009135
- AlphaFold: IPR009135

Identifiers
- Symbol: FLT1
- Alt. symbols: FLT
- NCBI gene: 2321
- HGNC: 3763
- OMIM: 165070
- RefSeq: NM_002019
- UniProt: P17948

Other data
- EC number: 2.7.1.112
- Locus: Chr. 13 q12
Search for
- Structures: Swiss-model
- Domains: InterPro

kinase insert domain receptor (a type III receptor tyrosine kinase)

Identifiers
- Symbol: KDR
- Alt. symbols: FLK1, VEGFR, VEGFR2, CD309
- NCBI gene: 3791
- HGNC: 6307
- OMIM: 191306
- RefSeq: NM_002253
- UniProt: P35968

Other data
- EC number: 2.7.1.112
- Locus: Chr. 4 q11-q12
Search for
- Structures: Swiss-model
- Domains: InterPro

fms-related tyrosine kinase 4

Identifiers
- Symbol: FLT4
- Alt. symbols: VEGFR3, PCL
- NCBI gene: 2324
- HGNC: 3767
- OMIM: 136352
- RefSeq: NM_002020
- UniProt: P35916

Other data
- EC number: 2.7.1.112
- Locus: Chr. 5 q34-q35
Search for
- Structures: Swiss-model
- Domains: InterPro

VEGF receptors (VEGFRs) are receptors for vascular endothelial growth factor (VEGF). There are three main subtypes of VEGFR, numbered 1, 2 and 3. Depending on alternative splicing, they may be membrane-bound (mbVEGFR) or soluble (sVEGFR).

Inhibitors of VEGFR are used in the treatment of cancer.

== VEGF ==
Vascular endothelial growth factor (VEGF) is an important signaling protein involved in both vasculogenesis (the formation of the circulatory system) and angiogenesis (the growth of blood vessels from pre-existing vasculature). As its name implies, VEGF activity is restricted mainly to cells of the vascular endothelium, although it does have effects on a limited number of other cell types (e.g. stimulation monocyte/macrophage migration). In vitro, VEGF has been shown to stimulate endothelial cell mitogenesis and cell migration. VEGF also enhances microvascular permeability and is sometimes referred to as vascular permeability factor.

== Receptor biology ==
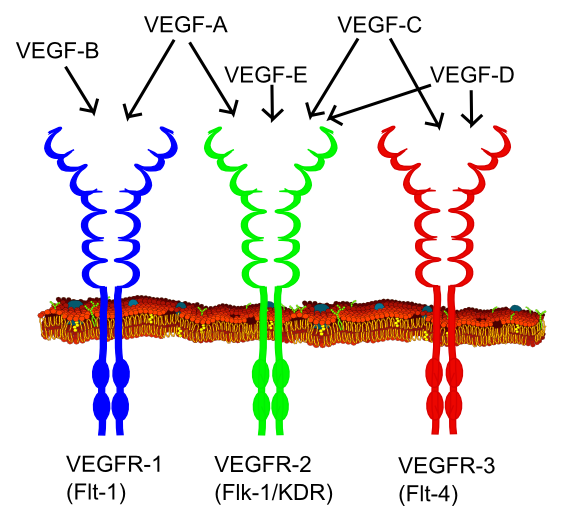
Ligands for different VEGF receptors.

All members of the VEGF family stimulate cellular responses by binding to tyrosine kinase receptors (the VEGFRs) on the cell surface, causing them to dimerize and become activated through transphosphorylation. The VEGF receptors have an extracellular portion consisting of 7 immunoglobulin-like domains, a single transmembrane spanning region and an intracellular portion containing a split tyrosine-kinase domain.

VEGF-A binds to VEGFR-1 (Flt-1) and VEGFR-2 (KDR/Flk-1). VEGFR-2 appears to mediate almost all of the known cellular responses to VEGF. The function of VEGFR-1 is less well defined, although it is thought to modulate VEGFR-2 signaling. Another function of VEGFR-1 is to act as a dummy/decoy receptor, sequestering VEGF from VEGFR-2 binding (this appears to be particularly important during vasculogenesis in the embryo). In fact, an alternatively spliced form of VEGFR-1 (sFlt1) is not a membrane bound protein but is secreted and functions primarily as a decoy. A third receptor has been discovered (VEGFR-3), however, VEGF-A is not a ligand for this receptor. VEGFR-3 mediates lymphangiogenesis in response to VEGF-C and VEGF-D.

In addition to binding to VEGFRs, VEGF binds to receptor complexes consisting of both neuropilins and VEGFRs. This receptor complex has increased VEGF signalling activity in endothelial cells (blood vessels). Neuropilins (NRP) are pleiotropic receptors and therefore other molecules may interfere with the signalling of the NRP/VEGFR receptor complexes. For example, Class 3 semaphorins compete with VEGF_{165} for NRP binding and could therefore regulate VEGF-mediated angiogenesis.
