= Vascular endothelial growth factor B =

Protein-coding gene in the species Homo sapiens

VEGFB
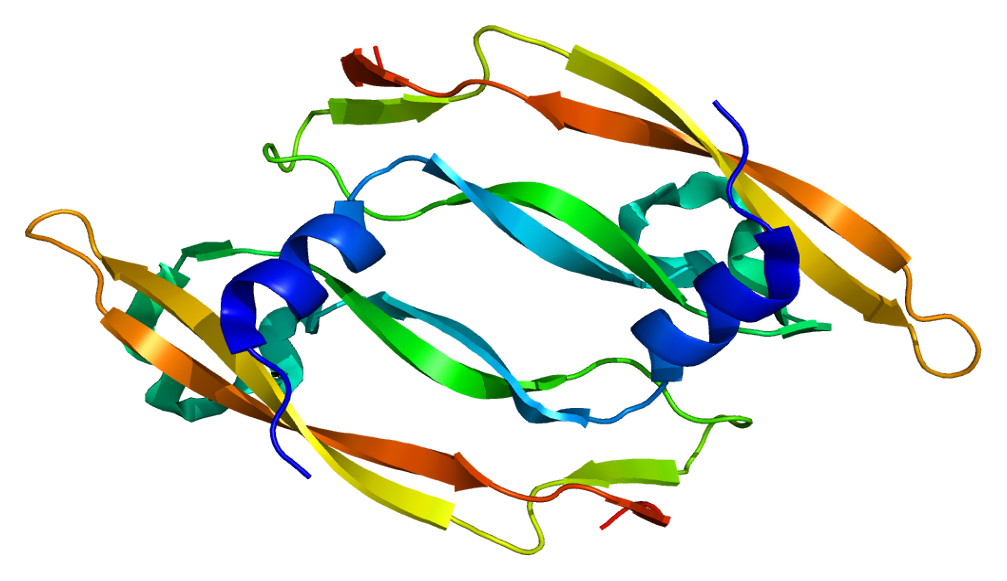

Identifiers
- Aliases: VEGFB, VEGFL, VRF, vascular endothelial growth factor B
- External IDs: OMIM: 601398; MGI: 106199; GeneCards: VEGFB
Available structures
| PDB | Ortholog search: PDBe RCSB |
| PDB | List of PDB id codes 2C7W, 2VWE, 2XAC |

Gene location (Human)
| Chr. | Chromosome 11 (human) |
| Band | 11q13.1 | Start | 64,234,584 bp |
| Band | 11q13.1 | End | 64,239,264 bp |

Gene location (Mouse)
| Chr. | Chromosome 19 (mouse) |
| Band | 19|19 A | Start | 6,959,841 bp |
| Band | 19|19 A | End | 6,965,019 bp |
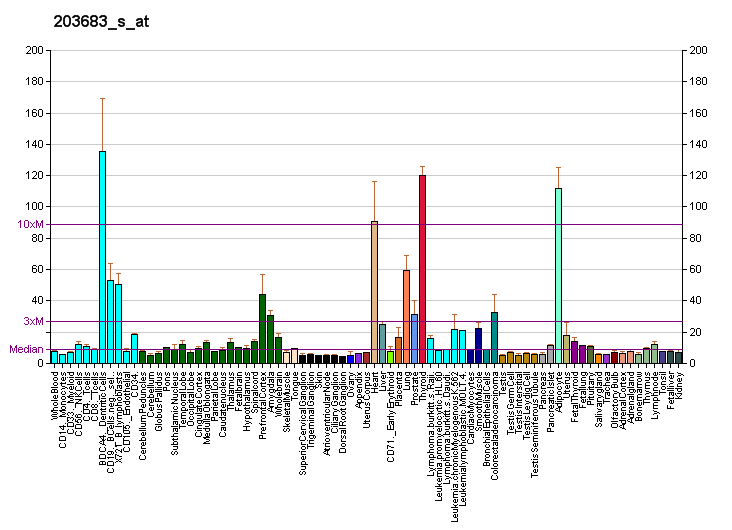
RNA expression pattern
| Bgee | Human / Mouse (ortholog); Top expressed in: apex of heart; right auricle of heart; right coronary artery; left coronary artery; popliteal artery; tibial arteries; Descending thoracic aorta; ascending aorta; muscle of thigh; muscle layer of sigmoid colon / Top expressed in: myocardium; myocardium of ventricle; right ventricle; interventricular septum; cardiac muscles; muscle of thigh; extraocular muscle; cardiac muscle tissue of left ventricle; digastric muscle; plantaris muscle; More reference expression data |
| BioGPS | More reference expression data |
Gene ontology
| Molecular function | heparin binding; protein homodimerization activity; protein binding; protein heterodimerization activity; chemoattractant activity; growth factor activity; vascular endothelial growth factor receptor 1 binding; vascular endothelial growth factor receptor 2 binding; vascular endothelial growth factor receptor 3 binding; vascular endothelial growth factor receptor binding |
| Cellular component | membrane; intracellular anatomical structure; extracellular region; platelet alpha granule lumen; extracellular space |
| Biological process | negative regulation of neuron apoptotic process; positive regulation of vascular endothelial growth factor receptor signaling pathway; positive regulation of protein kinase B signaling; cardiac muscle contraction; protein O-linked glycosylation; platelet degranulation; negative regulation of apoptotic process; coronary vasculature development; negative regulation of gene expression; development of the heart; positive regulation of vascular permeability; positive regulation of vascular wound healing; positive regulation of ERK1 and ERK2 cascade; positive regulation of peptidyl-tyrosine phosphorylation; positive regulation of cell division; positive chemotaxis; response to hypoxia; angiogenesis; positive regulation of endothelial cell proliferation; positive regulation of angiogenesis; vascular endothelial growth factor receptor signaling pathway; induction of positive chemotaxis; positive regulation of mast cell chemotaxis; regulation of signaling receptor activity; positive regulation of protein phosphorylation; sprouting angiogenesis; vascular endothelial growth factor signaling pathway |
Sources:Amigo / QuickGO
Orthologs
| Databases | NCBI: entry; OMA: entry |
| Species | Human | Mouse |
| Entrez | 7423 | 22340 |
| Ensembl | ENSG00000173511 | ENSMUSG00000024962 |
| UniProt | P49765 | P49766 |
| RefSeq (mRNA) | NM_003377; NM_001243733 | NM_001185164; NM_011697 |
| RefSeq (protein) | NP_001230662; NP_003368 | NP_001172093; NP_035827 |
| Location (UCSC) | Chr 11: 64.23 – 64.24 Mb | Chr 19: 6.96 – 6.97 Mb |
| PubMed search |
- Wikidata
| View/Edit Human | View/Edit Mouse |

Vascular endothelial growth factor B also known as VEGF-B is a protein that, in humans, is encoded by the VEGF-B gene. VEGF-B is a growth factor that belongs to the vascular endothelial growth factor family, of which VEGF-A is the best-known member.

== Function ==
In contrast to VEGF-A, VEGF-B plays a less pronounced role in the vascular system: Whereas VEGF-A is important for the formation of blood vessels, such as during development or in pathological conditions, VEGF-B seems to play a role only in the maintenance of newly formed blood vessels during pathological conditions. VEGF-B plays also an important role on several types of neurons. It is important for the protection of neurons in the retina and the cerebral cortex during stroke, and of motor neurons during motor neuron diseases such as amyotrophic lateral sclerosis.

VEGF-B exerts its effects via the FLT1 receptor. But the role of co-receptor NRP in VEGF-B-mediated effects is still unclear.

VEGF-B has also been found to control endothelial uptake and transport of fatty acids in heart and skeletal muscle.

== Interactions ==
Vascular endothelial growth factor B has been shown to interact with FLT1, NRP1 and NRP2.
