= PDGFB =

Protein-coding gene in the species Homo sapiens

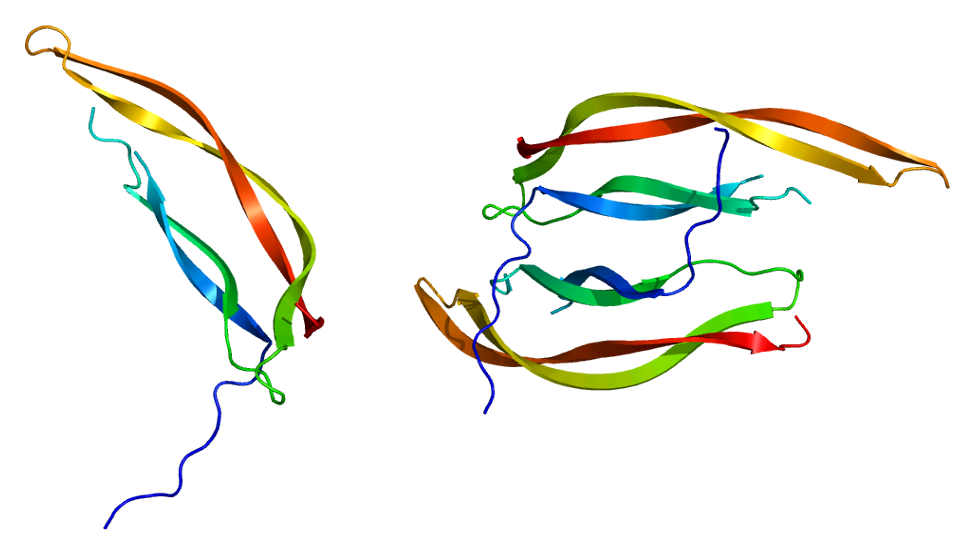

Identifiers
- Aliases: PDGFB, IBGC5, PDGF-2, PDGF2, SIS, SSV, c-sis, platelet derived growth factor subunit B
- External IDs: OMIM: 190040; MGI: 97528; GeneCards: PDGFB
Available structures
PDB	Ortholog search: PDBe RCSB
PDB	List of PDB id codes 1PDG, 3MJG, 4HQU, 4HQX, 4QCI

Gene location (Human)
Chr.	Chromosome 22 (human)
Band	22q13.1	Start	39,223,359 bp
Band	22q13.1	End	39,244,982 bp

Gene location (Mouse)
Chr.	Chromosome 15 (mouse)
Band	15 E1|15 37.85 cM	Start	79,995,874 bp
Band	15 E1|15 37.85 cM	End	80,014,977 bp
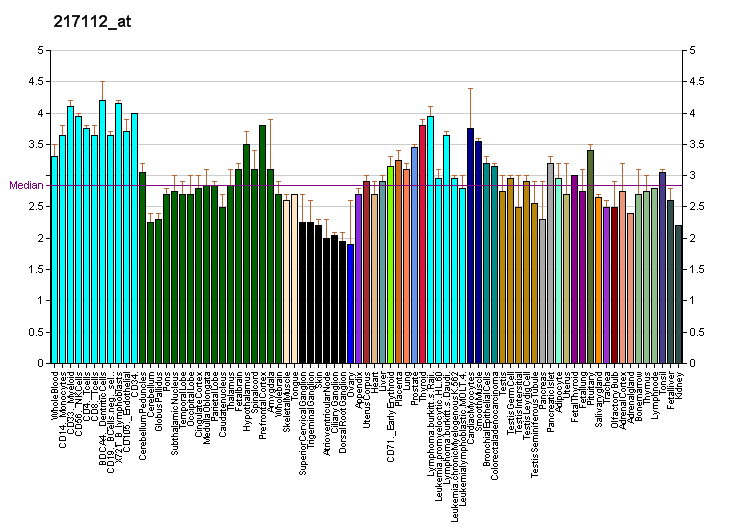

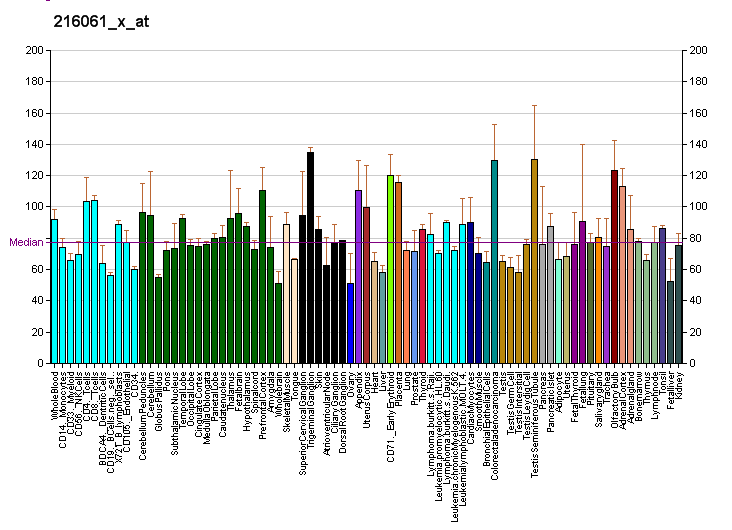

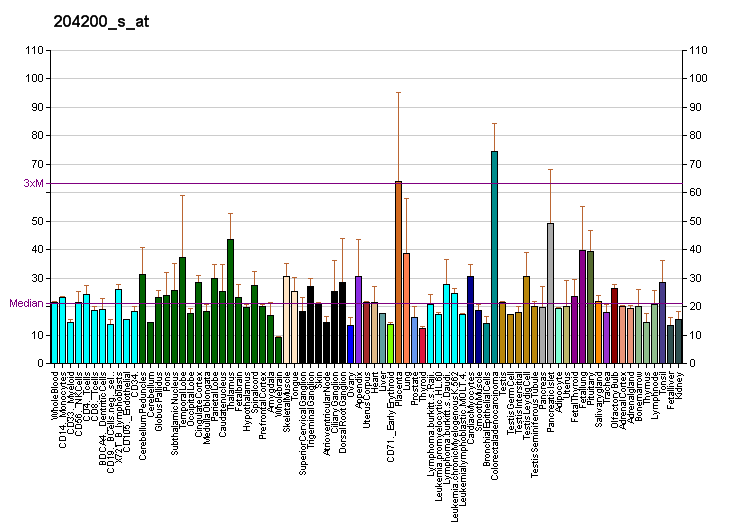
RNA expression pattern
Bgee	Human / Mouse (ortholog); Top expressed in: olfactory bulb; apex of heart; pancreatic ductal cell; right lung; vena cava; subcutaneous adipose tissue; triceps brachii muscle; left ventricle; upper lobe of left lung; right lobe of thyroid gland / Top expressed in: triceps brachii muscle; left lung; right lung; digastric muscle; left lung lobe; vastus lateralis muscle; sternocleidomastoid muscle; ankle; temporal muscle; right ventricle; More reference expression data
BioGPS	More reference expression data
Gene ontology
Molecular function	protein homodimerization activity; protein heterodimerization activity; chemoattractant activity; platelet-derived growth factor receptor binding; platelet-derived growth factor binding; superoxide-generating NADPH oxidase activator activity; growth factor activity; identical protein binding; collagen binding; protein binding; phosphatidylinositol-4,5-bisphosphate 3-kinase activity
Cellular component	platelet alpha granule lumen; cytoplasm; extracellular region; Golgi membrane; basolateral plasma membrane; cell surface; endoplasmic reticulum lumen; membrane; extracellular matrix; extracellular space; Golgi lumen; collagen-containing extracellular matrix
Biological process	activation of protein kinase B activity; positive regulation of DNA biosynthetic process; positive regulation of chemotaxis; cellular response to growth factor stimulus; positive regulation of protein tyrosine kinase activity; peptidyl-tyrosine phosphorylation; positive regulation of cell division; development of the heart; positive regulation of glomerular filtration; positive regulation of mitotic nuclear division; positive regulation of MAP kinase activity; positive regulation of metanephric mesenchymal cell migration; positive regulation of hyaluronan biosynthetic process; MAPK cascade; protein phosphorylation; positive regulation of glomerular mesangial cell proliferation; cellular response to mycophenolic acid; positive regulation of fibroblast proliferation; activation of protein kinase activity; multicellular organism development; positive regulation of protein autophosphorylation; positive regulation of reactive oxygen species metabolic process; reactive oxygen species metabolic process; negative regulation of transcription, DNA-templated; protein kinase C signaling; metanephric glomerular mesangial cell development; negative regulation of phosphatidylinositol biosynthetic process; response to wounding; positive regulation of phosphatidylinositol 3-kinase activity; cell chemotaxis; positive regulation of ERK1 and ERK2 cascade; platelet degranulation; positive regulation of cell population proliferation; positive regulation of DNA replication; positive regulation of gene expression; embryonic placenta development; paracrine signaling; monocyte chemotaxis; positive regulation of endothelial cell proliferation; positive regulation of phosphatidylinositol 3-kinase signaling; positive regulation of calcium ion import; positive regulation of transcription, DNA-templated; peptidyl-serine phosphorylation; positive regulation of metanephric mesenchymal cell migration by platelet-derived growth factor receptor-beta signaling pathway; positive regulation of blood vessel endothelial cell migration; hemopoiesis; positive regulation of cell migration; positive regulation of peptidyl-tyrosine phosphorylation; extracellular matrix organization; negative regulation of protein binding; positive regulation of MAPK cascade; positive regulation of cyclin-dependent protein serine/threonine kinase activity; negative regulation of platelet activation; phosphatidylinositol phosphate biosynthetic process; positive regulation of vascular associated smooth muscle cell migration; positive chemotaxis; negative regulation of vascular associated smooth muscle cell differentiation; interleukin-18-mediated signaling pathway; positive regulation of pri-miRNA transcription by RNA polymerase II; negative regulation of pri-miRNA transcription by RNA polymerase II; negative regulation of gene expression; positive regulation of smooth muscle cell migration; positive regulation of smooth muscle cell proliferation; positive regulation of vascular associated smooth muscle cell dedifferentiation; platelet-derived growth factor receptor signaling pathway; positive regulation of vascular associated smooth muscle cell proliferation; negative regulation of platelet-derived growth factor receptor-beta signaling pathway; regulation of signaling receptor activity; positive regulation of protein kinase B signaling
Sources:Amigo / QuickGO
Orthologs
Databases	NCBI: entry; OMA: entry
Species	Human	Mouse
Entrez	5155	18591
Ensembl	ENSG00000100311	ENSMUSG00000000489
UniProt	P01127	P31240
RefSeq (mRNA)	NM_033016; NM_002608	NM_011057
RefSeq (protein)	NP_002599; NP_148937	NP_035187
Location (UCSC)	Chr 22: 39.22 – 39.24 Mb	Chr 15: 80 – 80.01 Mb
PubMed search
- Wikidata
View/Edit Human	View/Edit Mouse

Platelet-derived growth factor subunit B is a protein that in humans is encoded by the PDGFB gene.

== Function ==
The protein encoded by this gene is a member of the platelet-derived growth factor family. The four members of this family are mitogenic factors for cells of mesenchymal origin and are characterized by a motif of eight cysteines. This gene product can exist either as a homodimer (PDGF-BB) or as a heterodimer with the platelet-derived growth factor alpha (PDGFA) polypeptide (PDGF-AB), where the dimers are connected by disulfide bonds.

== Clinical significance ==
Mutations in this gene are associated with meningioma. Reciprocal translocations between chromosomes 22 and 17, at sites where the PDGFB and COL1A1 genes are respectively located or, alternatively, an abnormal small supernumerary ring chromosome merge these two genes to form a COL1A-PDGFB fusion gene. This fusion gene greatly overproduces PDGFB and is considered responsible for causing the development and/or progression of three closely related fibroblastic and myofibroblastic tumors of the skin: giant cell fibroblastoma, dermatofibrosarcoma protuberans, and dermatofibrosarcoma protuberans, sarcomatous.

Two splice variants have been identified for the PDGFB gene.

== See also ==
- Platelet-derived growth factor
