= C-fos-induced growth factor =

Mammalian protein found in humans

VEGFD

Identifiers
- Aliases: VEGFD, VEGF-D, FIGF, C-fos induced growth factor, c-fos induced growth factor (vascular endothelial growth factor D), vascular endothelial growth factor D
- External IDs: OMIM: 300091; MGI: 108037; GeneCards: VEGFD
Available structures
PDB	Ortholog search: PDBe RCSB
PDB	List of PDB id codes 2XV7

Gene location (Human)
Chr.	X chromosome (human)
Band	Xp22.2	Start	15,345,596 bp
Band	Xp22.2	End	15,384,413 bp

Gene location (Mouse)
Chr.	X chromosome (mouse)
Band	X F5|X 76.35 cM	Start	163,156,374 bp
Band	X F5|X 76.35 cM	End	163,185,646 bp
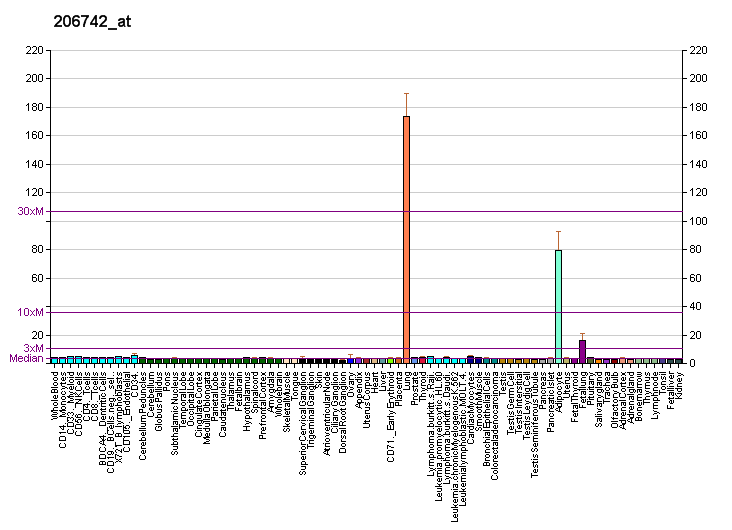
RNA expression pattern
Bgee	Human / Mouse (ortholog); Top expressed in: right lung; apex of heart; upper lobe of left lung; testicle; lactiferous duct; lower lobe of lung; gastrocnemius muscle; muscle of thigh; gastric mucosa; right adrenal cortex / Top expressed in: left lung lobe; tunica media of zone of aorta; umbilical cord; stroma of bone marrow; right lung; lumbar spinal ganglion; tunica adventitia of aorta; right lung lobe; vas deferens; calvaria; More reference expression data
BioGPS	More reference expression data
Gene ontology
Molecular function	protein homodimerization activity; platelet-derived growth factor receptor binding; chemoattractant activity; protein binding; vascular endothelial growth factor receptor binding; growth factor activity; vascular endothelial growth factor receptor 3 binding
Cellular component	membrane; extracellular region; platelet alpha granule lumen; extracellular space
Biological process	dopaminergic neuron differentiation; cell differentiation; positive regulation of mast cell chemotaxis; platelet degranulation; induction of positive chemotaxis; multicellular organism development; positive regulation of cell population proliferation; cell population proliferation; positive regulation of cell division; positive chemotaxis; angiogenesis; response to hypoxia; positive regulation of endothelial cell proliferation; positive regulation of angiogenesis; vascular endothelial growth factor receptor signaling pathway; regulation of signaling receptor activity; response to bacterium; positive regulation of protein phosphorylation; sprouting angiogenesis; vascular endothelial growth factor signaling pathway
Sources:Amigo / QuickGO
Orthologs
Databases	NCBI: entry; OMA: entry
Species	Human	Mouse
Entrez	2277	14205
Ensembl	ENSG00000165197	ENSMUSG00000031380
UniProt	O43915	P97946
RefSeq (mRNA)	NM_004469	NM_010216; NM_001308489
RefSeq (protein)	NP_004460	NP_001295418; NP_034346
Location (UCSC)	Chr X: 15.35 – 15.38 Mb	Chr X: 163.16 – 163.19 Mb
PubMed search
- Wikidata
View/Edit Human	View/Edit Mouse

C-fos-induced growth factor (FIGF) (or vascular endothelial growth factor D, VEGF-D) is a vascular endothelial growth factor that in humans is encoded by the FIGF gene.

== Function ==
The protein encoded by this gene is a member of the platelet-derived growth factor/vascular endothelial growth factor (PDGF/VEGF) family and is active in angiogenesis, lymphangiogenesis, and endothelial cell growth. This secreted protein undergoes a complex proteolytic maturation, generating multiple processed forms that bind and activate VEGFR-2 and VEGFR-3 receptors. The structure and function of this protein is similar to those of vascular endothelial growth factor C.

== Tumor metastasis to lymph nodes ==
Lymph node metastasis is very often associated with several types of human malignancies. Cancer cells’ journey to lymph node takes place largely through lymphatic tunnel located in and around of primary tumor. VEGF-D's interactions with VEGFR-3 predominantly expressed in lymphatic vessels plays a key role in restructuring lymphatic channel and, hence, able to alter its functions related to fluid and cell transport along the conduits. VEGF-D has been established to be over-expressed in both tumor tissues and patients’ serum samples in several types of human cancer. In addition, VEGF-D expression has been implicated with increased incidence of regional lymph node metastasis. In experimental mice study, genetically modified tumor cell that was forced to produce VEGF-D protein have been established to boost up regional lymph nodes metastases.
