= Osteopathia striata with cranial sclerosis =

Osteopatgia striata with cranial stenosis
- Other names: OSCS
- Specialty: Medical genetics, Radiology
- Symptoms: Bone anomalies mainly
- Complications: Respiratory arrest and nutritional deficiency
- Usual onset: Birth
- Duration: Lifelong
- Causes: Genetic mutation
- Prevention: none
- Prognosis: Medium
- Frequency: rare, between 70 and 90 cases have been described
- Deaths: –

Osteopathia striata with cranial sclerosis (OSCS) is a rare genetic entity characterized by osseous abnormalities.

== Signs and symptoms ==
Symptoms and their severity vary person to person but generally people with OSCS have generalized dysplasia of the distal parts of the long bones, cranial sclerosis (that is, the hardening of bones in the face and head), macrocephaly (abnormally large head), and cleft palate. Developmental delay, hearing loss, congenital heart defects, alongside feeding and breathing (dyspnea) difficulties are common as well, although they are not seen in all cases.

== Complications ==
The feeding and breathing difficulties that are sometimes associated with OSCS can result in starvation, nutritional deficiencies, and/or respiratory arrest if they remain untreated, which may result in early death.

== Treatment ==
Although OSCS has no cure, it can be treated and managed. Treatment is symptom-specific, for example: avoiding areas with air pollution (e.g., big cities, smoking areas, etc.), high-altitude areas, and physically exhausting activities can reduce breathlessness episodes (breathing difficulties).

== Causes ==
This condition is caused by X-linked dominant mutations in the AMER1 gene, in the X chromosome.

== Prevalence ==
According to OMIM, the total number of cases described in medical literature is between 70 and 90.
