= ADAMTS3 =

Protein-coding gene in humans

Identifiers
- Aliases: ADAMTS3, ADAMTS-4, ADAM metallopeptidase with thrombospondin type 1 motif 3, HKLLS3
- External IDs: OMIM: 605011; MGI: 3045353; GeneCards: ADAMTS3

Gene location (Human)
| Chr. | Chromosome 4 (human) |
| Band | 4q13.3 | Start | 72,280,969 bp |
| Band | 4q13.3 | End | 72,569,221 bp |

Gene location (Mouse)
| Chr. | Chromosome 5 (mouse) |
| Band | 5|5 E1 | Start | 89,824,946 bp |
| Band | 5|5 E1 | End | 90,031,193 bp |
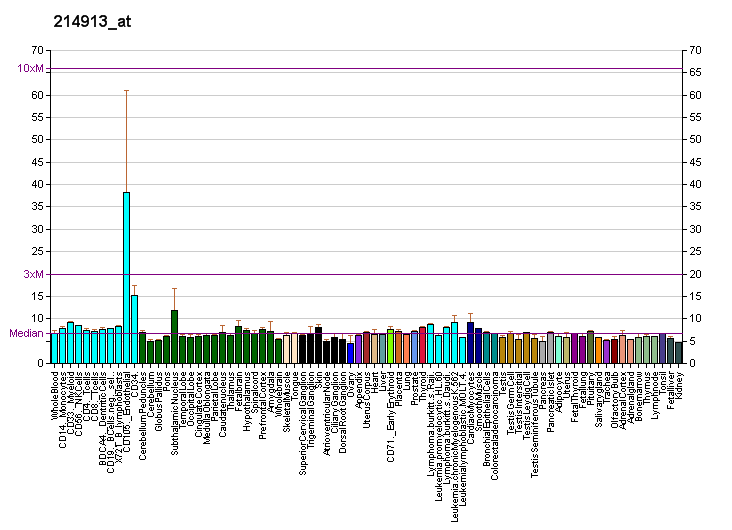
RNA expression pattern
| Bgee | Human / Mouse (ortholog); Top expressed in: endothelial cell; cartilage tissue; periodontal fiber; parietal pleura; germinal epithelium; tibia; testicle; caput epididymis; secondary oocyte; left uterine tube / Top expressed in: neural layer of retina; superior frontal gyrus; zygote; genital tubercle; dentate gyrus of hippocampal formation granule cell; primary visual cortex; ventricular zone; embryo; tail of embryo; secondary oocyte; More reference expression data |
| BioGPS | More reference expression data |
Gene ontology
| Molecular function | heparin binding; zinc ion binding; endopeptidase activity; metal ion binding; peptidase activity; protein binding; hydrolase activity; metallopeptidase activity; metalloendopeptidase activity |
| Cellular component | extracellular region; extracellular exosome; extracellular space; extracellular matrix; collagen-containing extracellular matrix |
| Biological process | vascular endothelial growth factor production; collagen fibril organization; protein processing; proteolysis; collagen biosynthetic process; positive regulation of vascular endothelial growth factor signaling pathway; collagen catabolic process; supramolecular fiber organization |
Sources:Amigo / QuickGO
Orthologs
| Databases | NCBI: entry; OMA: entry |
| Species | Human | Mouse |
| Entrez | 9508 | 330119 |
| Ensembl | ENSG00000156140 | ENSMUSG00000043635 |
| UniProt | O15072 | n/a |
| RefSeq (mRNA) | NM_014243 | NM_001081401; NM_177872 |
| RefSeq (protein) | NP_055058 | n/a |
| Location (UCSC) | Chr 4: 72.28 – 72.57 Mb | Chr 5: 89.82 – 90.03 Mb |
| PubMed search |
- Wikidata
| View/Edit Human | View/Edit Mouse |

A disintegrin and metalloproteinase with thrombospondin motifs 3 is an enzyme that in humans is encoded by the ADAMTS3 gene. The protein encoded by this gene is the major procollagen II N-propeptidase.

== Structure ==
This gene encodes a member of the ADAMTS (a disintegrin and metalloproteinase with thrombospondin motifs) protein family. Members of the family share several distinct protein modules, including a propeptide region, a metalloproteinase domain, a disintegrin-like domain, and a thrombospondin type 1 (TS) motif. Individual members of this family differ in the number of C-terminal TS motifs, and some have unique C-terminal domains. The protein encoded by this gene is the major procollagen II N-propeptidase.

== Function ==
Because of the high similarity to ADAMTS2, the major substrate of ADAMTS3 had been erroneously assumed to be procollagen II. However, ADAMTS3 appears largely irrelevant for collagen maturation but instead is required for the activation of the lymphangiogenic growth factor VEGF-C. Hence, ADAMTS3 is essential for the development and growth of lymphatic vessels. The proteolytic processing of VEGF-C by ADAMTS3 is regulated by the CCBE1 protein.

ADAMTS3 has been shown to cleave reelin, a protein that regulates the proper lamination of the brain cortex and whose signal activity is found to be disrupted in a number of neuropsychiatric conditions.

== Clinical significance ==
A deficiency of this protein may be responsible for dermatosparaxis, a genetic defect of connective tissues.

Some hereditary forms of lymphedema are caused by mutations in ADAMTS3.
