= FLT4 =

Protein-coding gene in the species Homo sapiens

Identifiers
- Aliases: FLT4, FLT41, LMPH1A, PCL, VEGFR3, FLT-4, VEGFR-3, fms related tyrosine kinase 4, LMPHM1, fms related receptor tyrosine kinase 4, CHTD7
- External IDs: OMIM: 136352; MGI: 95561; GeneCards: FLT4
Available structures
PDB	Ortholog search: PDBe RCSB
PDB	List of PDB id codes 4BSJ, 4BSK
Enzyme activity
EC #	BRENDA	ExPASy	KEGG	MetaCyc
2.7.10.1	↗	↗	↗	↗

Gene location (Human)
Chr.	Chromosome 5 (human)
Band	5q35.3	Start	180,601,506 bp
Band	5q35.3	End	180,649,624 bp

Gene location (Mouse)
Chr.	Chromosome 11 (mouse)
Band	11 B1.2|11 29.69 cM	Start	49,500,090 bp
Band	11 B1.2|11 29.69 cM	End	49,543,566 bp
RNA expression pattern
Bgee	Human / Mouse (ortholog); Top expressed in: right lobe of thyroid gland; left lobe of thyroid gland; apex of heart; right lung; upper lobe of left lung; sural nerve; spleen; right uterine tube; left uterine tube; body of uterus / Top expressed in: endothelial cell of lymphatic vessel; internal carotid artery; left lobe of liver; decidua; external carotid artery; mesenteric lymph nodes; left lung; left lung lobe; right lung; aortic valve; More reference expression data
BioGPS	n/a
Gene ontology
Molecular function	vascular endothelial growth factor-activated receptor activity; transferase activity; nucleotide binding; protein kinase activity; growth factor binding; kinase activity; protein binding; transmembrane receptor protein tyrosine kinase activity; protein tyrosine kinase activity; protein phosphatase binding; ATP binding; protein homodimerization activity; receptor tyrosine kinase; transmembrane signaling receptor activity; vascular endothelial growth factor binding
Cellular component	cytoplasm; integral component of membrane; membrane; receptor complex; plasma membrane; integral component of plasma membrane; extracellular region; nucleus; nucleoplasm
Biological process	regulation of blood vessel remodeling; positive regulation of protein phosphorylation; positive regulation of endothelial cell proliferation; blood vessel morphogenesis; lymphangiogenesis; phosphorylation; transmembrane receptor protein tyrosine kinase signaling pathway; positive regulation of protein kinase C signaling; negative regulation of apoptotic process; sprouting angiogenesis; positive regulation of JNK cascade; lymph vessel development; positive regulation of endothelial cell migration; protein phosphorylation; vascular endothelial growth factor receptor signaling pathway; vasculature development; angiogenesis; positive regulation of cell population proliferation; positive regulation of ERK1 and ERK2 cascade; protein autophosphorylation; positive regulation of vascular endothelial growth factor production; peptidyl-tyrosine phosphorylation; cellular response to vascular endothelial growth factor stimulus; positive regulation of MAPK cascade; lung alveolus development; respiratory system process; respiratory gaseous exchange by respiratory system; vascular endothelial growth factor signaling pathway; negative regulation of signal transduction; cell differentiation; positive regulation of phosphatidylinositol 3-kinase signaling
Sources:Amigo / QuickGO
Orthologs
Databases	NCBI: entry; OMA: entry
Species	Human	Mouse
Entrez	2324	14257
Ensembl	ENSG00000037280	ENSMUSG00000020357
UniProt	P35916	P35917
RefSeq (mRNA)	NM_002020; NM_182925; NM_001354989	NM_008029
RefSeq (protein)	NP_002011; NP_891555; NP_001341918	NP_032055
Location (UCSC)	Chr 5: 180.6 – 180.65 Mb	Chr 11: 49.5 – 49.54 Mb
PubMed search
- Wikidata
View/Edit Human	View/Edit Mouse

Fms-related tyrosine kinase 4, also known as FLT4, is a protein which in humans is encoded by the FLT4 gene.

This gene encodes a tyrosine kinase receptor for vascular endothelial growth factors C and D. The protein is thought to be involved in lymphangiogenesis and maintenance of the lymphatic endothelium. Mutations in this gene cause hereditary lymphedema type IA.

== Interactions ==
FLT4 has been shown to interact with SHC1.

== See also ==
- VEGF receptors
