= Transphosphorylation =

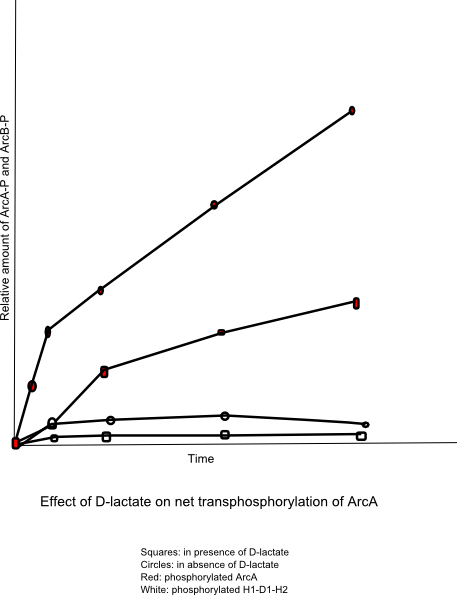

Transphosphorylation is a chemical reaction in which a phosphate group or a phosphono group is transferred between a substrate and a receptor. There are various phosphate esters in living body including nucleic acid, and phosphorylation reaction related to their synthesis and interconversion is the basis of biochemical reaction. In most cases, ATP is the substrate of the phosphate group as a substrate and the enzyme that catalyzes these reactions is referred to as kinase.
