= PDGFA =

Mammalian protein found in Homo sapiens

Identifiers
- Aliases: PDGFA, PDGF-A, PDGF1, platelet derived growth factor subunit A
- External IDs: OMIM: 173430; MGI: 97527; GeneCards: PDGFA
Available structures
PDB	Ortholog search: PDBe RCSB
PDB	List of PDB id codes 3MJK

Gene location (Human)
Chr.	Chromosome 7 (human)
Band	7p22.3	Start	497,258 bp
Band	7p22.3	End	520,296 bp

Gene location (Mouse)
Chr.	Chromosome 5 (mouse)
Band	5 G2|5 77.65 cM	Start	138,961,769 bp
Band	5 G2|5 77.65 cM	End	138,983,125 bp
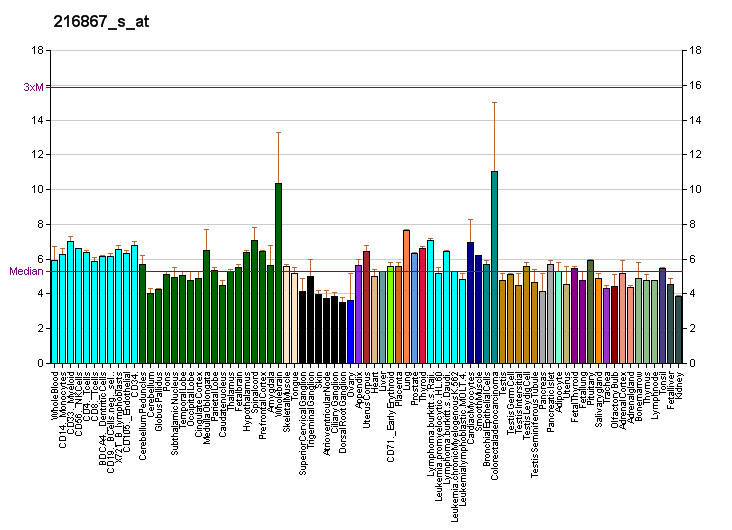

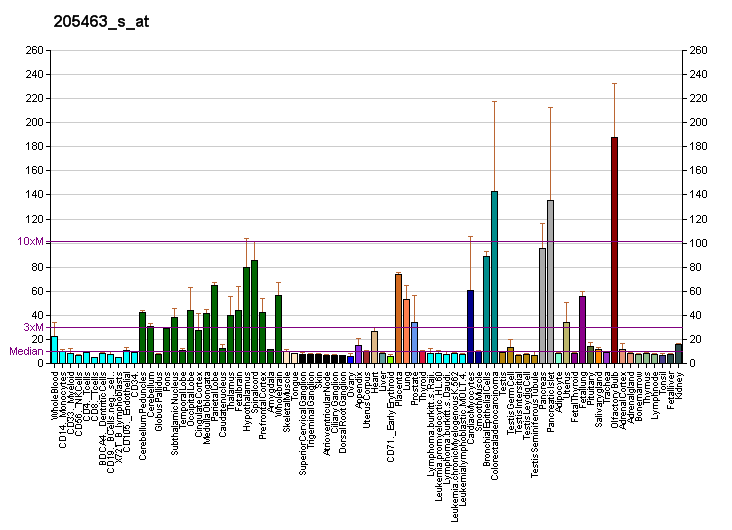
RNA expression pattern
Bgee	Human / Mouse (ortholog); Top expressed in: buccal mucosa cell; ascending aorta; Descending thoracic aorta; right coronary artery; body of pancreas; popliteal artery; tibial arteries; left coronary artery; optic nerve; C1 segment / Top expressed in: Ileal epithelium; choroid plexus of fourth ventricle; calvaria; choroidal fissure; entorhinal cortex; tunica media of zone of aorta; iris; retinal pigment epithelium; perirhinal cortex; CA3 field; More reference expression data
BioGPS	More reference expression data
Gene ontology
Molecular function	collagen binding; protein homodimerization activity; platelet-derived growth factor receptor binding; protein binding; platelet-derived growth factor binding; protein heterodimerization activity; growth factor activity; phosphatidylinositol-4,5-bisphosphate 3-kinase activity; identical protein binding
Cellular component	endoplasmic reticulum lumen; membrane; Golgi membrane; extracellular region; microvillus; cell surface; platelet alpha granule lumen; extracellular space; Golgi lumen
Biological process	hair follicle development; embryonic lung development; positive regulation of metanephric mesenchymal cell migration by platelet-derived growth factor receptor-beta signaling pathway; negative chemotaxis; regulation of actin cytoskeleton organization; positive regulation of MAP kinase activity; regulation of branching involved in salivary gland morphogenesis by epithelial-mesenchymal signaling; positive regulation of cell migration; positive regulation of fibroblast proliferation; cell-cell signaling; platelet degranulation; extracellular matrix organization; regulation of DNA biosynthetic process; cell activation; MAPK cascade; negative regulation of platelet activation; multicellular organism development; positive regulation of mesenchymal cell proliferation; response to wounding; cell projection assembly; negative regulation of phosphatidylinositol biosynthetic process; angiogenesis; positive regulation of protein autophosphorylation; positive regulation of ERK1 and ERK2 cascade; regulation of smooth muscle cell migration; animal organ morphogenesis; positive regulation of phosphatidylinositol 3-kinase signaling; platelet-derived growth factor receptor signaling pathway; lung alveolus development; positive regulation of cell division; actin cytoskeleton organization; positive regulation of MAPK cascade; skin development; regulation of glomerular mesangial cell proliferation; regulation of peptidyl-tyrosine phosphorylation; wound healing; phosphatidylinositol phosphate biosynthetic process; positive regulation of cell population proliferation; regulation of signaling receptor activity; positive regulation of protein kinase B signaling
Sources:Amigo / QuickGO
Orthologs
Databases	NCBI: entry; OMA: entry
Species	Human	Mouse
Entrez	5154	18590
Ensembl	ENSG00000197461	ENSMUSG00000025856
UniProt	P04085	P20033
RefSeq (mRNA)	NM_002607; NM_033023; NM_001395363; NM_001395364; NM_001395365 NM_001395366	NM_008808; NM_001363271
RefSeq (protein)	NP_002598; NP_148983	NP_032834; NP_001350200
Location (UCSC)	Chr 7: 0.5 – 0.52 Mb	Chr 5: 138.96 – 138.98 Mb
PubMed search
- Wikidata
View/Edit Human	View/Edit Mouse

Platelet-derived growth factor subunit A is a protein that in humans is encoded by the PDGFA gene.

The protein encoded by this gene is a member of the platelet-derived growth factor family. The four members of this family are mitogenic factors for cells of mesenchymal origin and are characterized by a motif of eight cysteines. This gene product can exist either as a homodimer or as a heterodimer with the platelet-derived growth factor beta polypeptide, where the dimers are connected by disulfide bonds. Studies using knockout mice have shown cellular defects in oligodendrocytes, alveolar smooth muscle cells, and Leydig cells in the testis; knockout mice die either as embryos or shortly after birth. Two splice variants have been identified for this gene.
