= VEGFR1 =

Protein-coding gene in the species Homo sapiens

FLT1
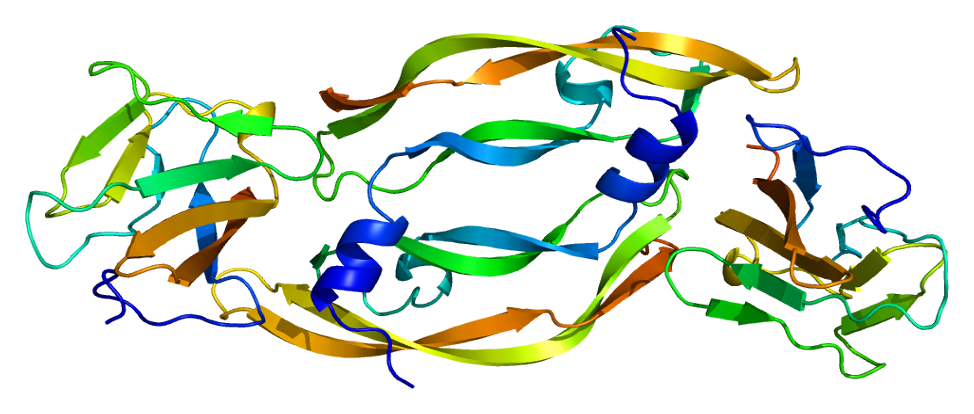

Identifiers
- Aliases: FLT1, FLT, FLT-1, VEGFR-1, VEGFR1, fms related tyrosine kinase 1, vascular endothelial growth factor receptor 1, fms related receptor tyrosine kinase 1
- External IDs: OMIM: 165070; MGI: 95558; GeneCards: FLT1
Available structures
PDB	Ortholog search: PDBe RCSB
PDB	List of PDB id codes 1FLT, 1QSV, 1QSZ, 1QTY, 1RV6, 2XAC, 3HNG, 4CKV, 4CL7, 5EX3
Enzyme activity
EC #	BRENDA	ExPASy	KEGG	MetaCyc
2.7.10.1	↗	↗	↗	↗

Gene location (Human)
Chr.	Chromosome 13 (human)
Band	13q12.3	Start	28,300,346 bp
Band	13q12.3	End	28,495,145 bp

Gene location (Mouse)
Chr.	Chromosome 5 (mouse)
Band	5 G3|5 87.01 cM	Start	147,498,414 bp
Band	5 G3|5 87.01 cM	End	147,662,821 bp
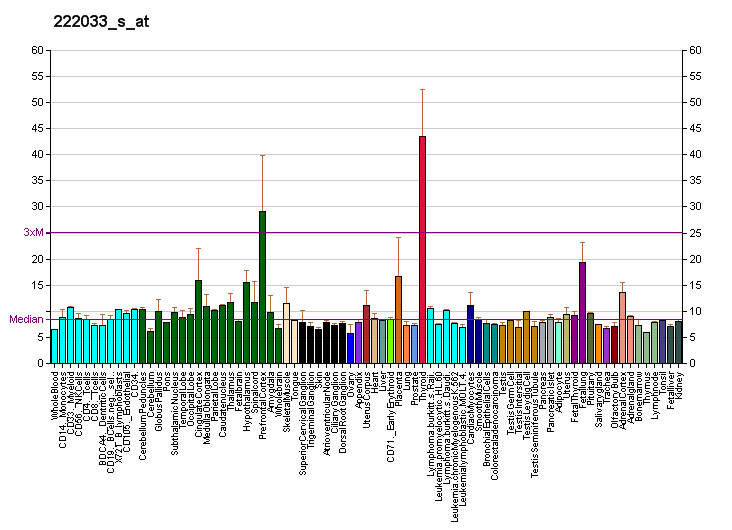
RNA expression pattern
Bgee	Human / Mouse (ortholog); Top expressed in: pericardium; placenta; endothelial cell; right ventricle; myocardium of left ventricle; dorsal motor nucleus of vagus nerve; cardia; thyroid gland; left lobe of thyroid gland; internal globus pallidus / Top expressed in: right lung; right lung lobe; internal carotid artery; myocardium of ventricle; muscle of thigh; external carotid artery; umbilical cord; cardiac muscle tissue of left ventricle; islet of Langerhans; substantia nigra; More reference expression data
BioGPS	More reference expression data
Gene ontology
Molecular function	vascular endothelial growth factor-activated receptor activity; transferase activity; nucleotide binding; protein kinase activity; placental growth factor-activated receptor activity; kinase activity; protein binding; transmembrane receptor protein tyrosine kinase activity; protein tyrosine kinase activity; ATP binding; growth factor binding; vascular endothelial growth factor binding
Cellular component	cytoplasm; integral component of membrane; endosome; focal adhesion; membrane; receptor complex; integral component of plasma membrane; extracellular region; extracellular space; plasma membrane; actin cytoskeleton
Biological process	positive regulation of vascular endothelial growth factor receptor signaling pathway; cell differentiation; blood vessel morphogenesis; vascular endothelial growth factor receptor-1 signaling pathway; positive regulation of MAP kinase activity; monocyte chemotaxis; positive regulation of phospholipase C activity; transmembrane receptor protein tyrosine kinase signaling pathway; vascular endothelial growth factor signaling pathway; phosphorylation; positive regulation of angiogenesis; positive regulation of phosphatidylinositol 3-kinase activity; multicellular organism development; chemotaxis; protein phosphorylation; vascular endothelial growth factor receptor signaling pathway; embryonic morphogenesis; angiogenesis; protein autophosphorylation; positive regulation of phosphatidylinositol 3-kinase signaling; peptidyl-tyrosine phosphorylation; cellular response to vascular endothelial growth factor stimulus; cell migration; positive regulation of MAPK cascade; positive regulation of cell population proliferation; positive regulation of cell migration; sprouting angiogenesis; positive regulation of ERK1 and ERK2 cascade; negative regulation of vascular endothelial cell proliferation
Sources:Amigo / QuickGO
Orthologs
Databases	NCBI: entry; OMA: entry
Species	Human	Mouse
Entrez	2321	14254
Ensembl	ENSG00000102755	ENSMUSG00000029648
UniProt	P17948	P35969
RefSeq (mRNA)	NM_001159920; NM_001160030; NM_001160031; NM_002019	NM_010228; NM_001363135
RefSeq (protein)	NP_001153392; NP_001153502; NP_001153503; NP_002010	NP_034358; NP_001350064
Location (UCSC)	Chr 13: 28.3 – 28.5 Mb	Chr 5: 147.5 – 147.66 Mb
PubMed search
- Wikidata
View/Edit Human	View/Edit Mouse

Vascular endothelial growth factor receptor 1 is a protein that in humans is encoded by the FLT1 gene.

== Function ==
FLT1 is a member of VEGF receptor gene family. It encodes a receptor tyrosine kinase which is activated by VEGF-A, VEGF-B, and placental growth factor. The sequence structure of the FLT1 gene resembles that of the FMS (now CSF1R) gene; hence, Yoshida et al. (1987) proposed the name FLT as an acronym for FMS-like tyrosine kinase.

The ablation of VEGFR1 by chemical and genetic means has also recently been found to augment the conversion of white adipose tissue to brown adipose tissue as well as increase brown adipose angiogenesis in mice.

Functional genetic variation in FLT1 (rs9582036) has been found to affect non-small cell lung cancer survival.

== Interactions ==
FLT1 has been shown to interact with PLCG1 and vascular endothelial growth factor B (VEGF-B).

== See also ==
- VEGF receptors
