= Kinase insert domain receptor =

Protein-coding gene in the species Homo sapiens

KDR
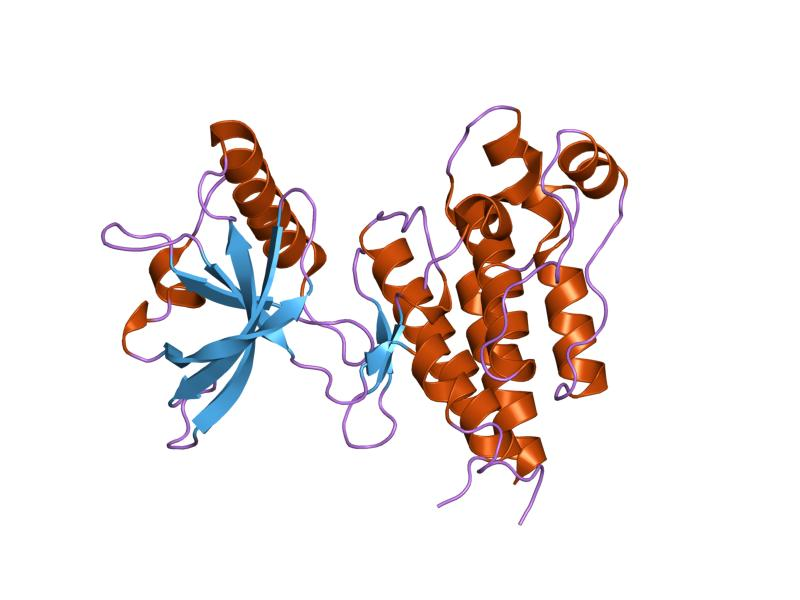

Identifiers
- Aliases: KDR, CD309, FLK1, VEGFR, VEGFR2, Kinase insert domain receptor
- External IDs: OMIM: 191306; MGI: 96683; GeneCards: KDR
Available structures
| PDB | Ortholog search: PDBe RCSB |
| PDB | List of PDB id codes 1VR2, 1Y6A, 1Y6B, 1YWN, 2M59, 2MET, 2MEU, 2OH4, 2P2H, 2P2I, 2QU5, 2QU6, 2RL5, 2X1W, 2X1X, 2XIR, 3B8Q, 3B8R, 3BE2, 3C7Q, 3CJF, 3CJG, 3CP9, 3CPB, 3CPC, 3DTW, 3EFL, 3EWH, 3KVQ, 3S35, 3S36, 3S37, 3U6J, 3VHE, 3VHK, 3VID, 3VNT, 3VO3, 3WZD, 3WZE, 4AG8, 4AGC, 4AGD, 4ASD, 4ASE, 5EW3 |
Enzyme activity
| EC # | BRENDA | ExPASy | KEGG | MetaCyc |
|---|---|---|---|---|
| 2.7.10.1 | ↗ | ↗ | ↗ | ↗ |

Gene location (Human)
| Chr. | Chromosome 4 (human) |
| Band | 4q12 | Start | 55,078,481 bp |
| Band | 4q12 | End | 55,125,595 bp |

Gene location (Mouse)
| Chr. | Chromosome 5 (mouse) |
| Band | 5 C3.3|5 40.23 cM | Start | 76,093,487 bp |
| Band | 5 C3.3|5 40.23 cM | End | 76,139,118 bp |
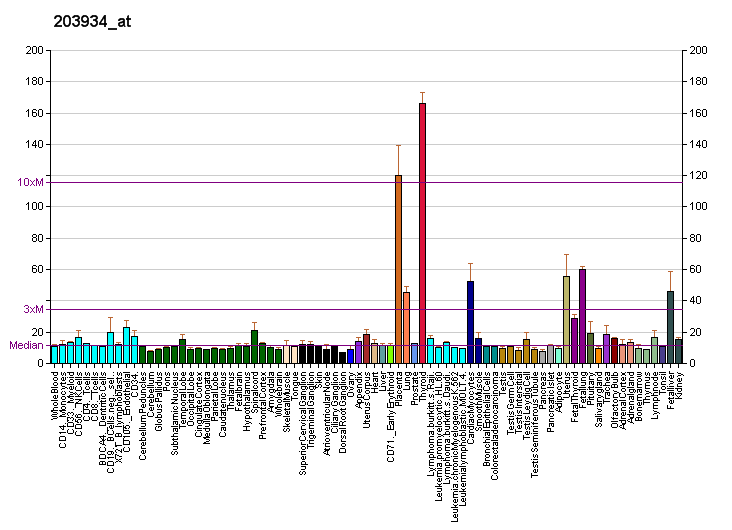
RNA expression pattern
| Bgee | Human / Mouse (ortholog); Top expressed in: germinal epithelium; lower lobe of lung; parietal pleura; pericardium; decidua; right lobe of thyroid gland; right lung; body of uterus; left lobe of thyroid gland; upper lobe of lung / Top expressed in: vasculature of trunk; Vasculature of brain; vein; dorsal aorta; left lung; left lung lobe; right lung; endothelial cell of lymphatic vessel; right lung lobe; neural layer of retina; More reference expression data |
| BioGPS | More reference expression data |
Gene ontology
| Molecular function | transferase activity; Hsp90 protein binding; nucleotide binding; protein kinase activity; growth factor binding; vascular endothelial growth factor binding; kinase activity; integrin binding; protein binding; ATP binding; transmembrane receptor protein tyrosine kinase activity; vascular endothelial growth factor-activated receptor activity; protein tyrosine kinase activity; identical protein binding; receptor tyrosine kinase; transmembrane signaling receptor activity; cadherin binding |
| Cellular component | cytoplasm; integral component of membrane; Golgi apparatus; membrane; integral component of plasma membrane; extracellular region; cell junction; early endosome; membrane raft; sorting endosome; cytoplasmic vesicle; nucleus; endosome; plasma membrane; endoplasmic reticulum; receptor complex |
| Biological process | negative regulation of endothelial cell apoptotic process; cell differentiation; positive regulation of protein phosphorylation; positive regulation of mitochondrial fission; positive regulation of endothelial cell proliferation; phosphorylation; extracellular matrix organization; negative regulation of apoptotic process; positive regulation of nitric-oxide synthase biosynthetic process; cell migration involved in sprouting angiogenesis; positive regulation of angiogenesis; vasculogenesis; positive regulation of endothelial cell migration; multicellular organism development; protein phosphorylation; positive regulation of macroautophagy; positive regulation of mitochondrial depolarization; positive regulation of vasculogenesis; embryonic hemopoiesis; endothelium development; regulation of cell shape; positive regulation of endothelial cell chemotaxis by VEGF-activated vascular endothelial growth factor receptor signaling pathway; positive regulation of ERK1 and ERK2 cascade; peptidyl-tyrosine autophosphorylation; protein autophosphorylation; positive regulation of focal adhesion assembly; positive regulation of phosphatidylinositol 3-kinase signaling; peptidyl-tyrosine phosphorylation; cellular response to vascular endothelial growth factor stimulus; viral process; calcium-mediated signaling using intracellular calcium source; positive regulation of MAPK cascade; positive regulation of positive chemotaxis; transmembrane receptor protein tyrosine kinase signaling pathway; vascular endothelial growth factor receptor signaling pathway; positive regulation of cell population proliferation; angiogenesis; positive regulation of cell migration; protein kinase B signaling; ERK1 and ERK2 cascade; negative regulation of gene expression; positive regulation of blood vessel endothelial cell migration; cellular response to hydrogen sulfide; positive regulation of cell migration involved in sprouting angiogenesis; negative regulation of signal transduction; sprouting angiogenesis; cell migration; endothelial cell differentiation |
Sources:Amigo / QuickGO
Orthologs
| Databases | NCBI: entry; OMA: entry |
| Species | Human | Mouse |
| Entrez | 3791 | 16542 |
| Ensembl | ENSG00000128052 | ENSMUSG00000062960 |
| UniProt | P35968 | P35918; Q8VCD0 |
| RefSeq (mRNA) | NM_002253 | NM_010612; NM_001363216 |
| RefSeq (protein) | NP_002244 | NP_034742; NP_001350145 |
| Location (UCSC) | Chr 4: 55.08 – 55.13 Mb | Chr 5: 76.09 – 76.14 Mb |
| PubMed search |
- Wikidata
| View/Edit Human | View/Edit Mouse |

Kinase insert domain receptor (KDR, a type IV receptor tyrosine kinase) also known as vascular endothelial growth factor receptor 2 (VEGFR-2) is a VEGF receptor. KDR is the human gene encoding it. KDR has also been designated as CD309 (cluster of differentiation 309). KDR is also known as Flk1 (Fetal Liver Kinase 1).

The Q472H germline KDR genetic variant affects VEGFR-2 phosphorylation and has been found to associate with microvessel density in NSCLC.

== Interactions ==
Kinase insert domain receptor has been shown to interact with SHC2, Annexin A5 and SHC1.

== Role in diseases ==
KDR is a key driver of normal and pathological angiogenesis, and is therefore targeted in oncological and ophthalmological conditions involving neovascularization. In ophthalmological diseases such as age-related macular degerenation or diabetic retinopathy, its ligands are blocked by biotechnological products such as Aflibercept. In oncology, to inhibit tumor neovascularization, the ATP binding site of KDR can be targeted by competitive small-molecule inhibitors such as sunitinib or vorolanib. Novel derivatives of these competitive inhibitors such as viridisorbitinib (EYE1090) or viridisorbolanib (EYE1118) may be effective to block neovascularization both in ocular and oncological conditions, since these molecules can be targeted by light within the body.

== See also ==
- Cluster of differentiation
- VEGF receptors
