= Sozinibercept =

Clinical data
- Other names: OPT-302
- Routes of administration: Intravitreal
- Drug class: VEGF-C and VEGF-D inhibitor

Legal status
- Legal status: Investigational

Identifiers
- CAS Number: 2568358-31-4
- UNII: C42QTP3IMX
- KEGG: D12635
- ChEMBL: ChEMBL5095152

Sozinibercept was an investigational drug intended to be used to treat certain eye conditions such as wet age-related macular degeneration (AMD). It is administered intravitreally in combination with other Anti-VEGF-A including aflibercept, faricimab, ranibizumab, and bevacizumab. It is developed by Opthea. It was granted Fast track designation by the United States Food and Drug Administration (FDA).

Sozinibercept is a “trap” fusion protein that targets vascular endothelial growth factors C and D (VEGF-C and VEGF-D), aiming to inhibit abnormal blood vessel growth and fluid leakage in retinal diseases such as wet age-related macular degeneration (AMD). Sozinibercept is synergistic with anti–VEGF-A therapies because it targets and neutralizes VEGF-C and VEGF-D, while anti–VEGF-A drugs inhibit only VEGF-A; this combined blockade suppresses a broader range of VEGF-driven pathways involved in abnormal blood vessel growth and vascular leakage in retinal diseases.

Despite promising results in early-phase clinical trials, recent late-stage trials failed to meet their primary endpoints for vision improvement, leading to the discontinuation of its development for wet AMD.
