= Intravitreal gene therapy =

Intravitreal gene therapy represents an approach to treating retinal diseases by delivering therapeutic genes directly into the vitreous humor of the eye. This method uses a viral vector, often an adeno-associated virus (AAV), to carry genetic material into retinal cells. Once inside, the therapeutic genes are expressed to address genetic deficiencies or modify biological pathways, offering a long-term or potentially permanent treatment ("biofactory approach") for conditions like wet age-related macular degeneration (AMD), diabetic macular edema, and inherited retinal dystrophies. Unlike traditional therapies requiring frequent injections, intravitreal gene therapy aims to reduce the treatment burden while improving efficacy potentially providing lifelong benefit.

== Advantages and challenges ==
One of the key advantages of intravitreal administration is its minimally invasive nature compared to subretinal delivery. Intravitreal injections are already commonly used for administering drugs like anti-VEGF agents, making the procedure familiar to clinicians and safer for patients. The eye's immune-privileged status reduces the likelihood of immune responses to the viral vector, increasing the therapy's safety profile. Emerging clinical trials are exploring this modality's potential, with promising results indicating sustained benefits over months or years after a single treatment.

Despite its potential, challenges remain. One major hurdle is ensuring efficient transduction of retinal cells via the intravitreal route, as the viral vectors must traverse physical and biological barriers. Additionally, safety concerns, such as inflammation or unintended effects on neighboring cells, must be carefully monitored. Ongoing innovations in vector design and delivery systems aim to address these issues, paving the way for broader applications of intravitreal gene therapy in ophthalmology. This field continues to evolve, offering hope for more effective and less invasive treatments for debilitating eye diseases.

== Investigational agents ==
Investigational agents for intravitreal and subretinal gene therapies are advancing rapidly, targeting various retinal disorders. In neovascular age-related macular degeneration (nAMD), key intravitreal agents include Adverum Biotechnologies' ixoberogene soroparvovec (Ixo-vec) and 4D Molecular Therapeutics' 4D-150. Both use innovative mechanisms to produce anti-VEGF proteins directly within the eye, significantly reducing the need for frequent anti-VEGF injections. Janssen's JNJ-1887 targets dry AMD with a complement pathway approach, while other agents like RGX-314 from REGENXBIO focus on sustained anti-VEGF effects delivered via subretinal routes. These therapies demonstrate promising improvements in retinal structure and vision while minimizing treatment burdens.

For inherited retinal diseases, several subretinal therapies are in advanced stages. MeiraGTx's botaretigene sparoparvovec targets X-linked retinitis pigmentosa through RPGR gene restoration and Beacon Therapeutics' laruparetigene zosaparvovec aims at similar conditions, showing retinal sensitivity improvements in trials. Another notable effort is Atsena Therapeutics' ATSN-201 for X-linked retinoschisis. These therapies focus on gene replacement to preserve or restore vision. However, challenges such as delivery complexities and immunogenicity remain.

Future directions include improving delivery techniques like suprachoroidal catheter systems, which avoid invasive procedures, and addressing scalability and cost concerns. The goal is to transform these therapies into accessible options, providing lasting benefits and potentially revolutionizing care for both common and rare retinal disorders .
