= Probico =

Cofactors

Probico also known as PBCo, is a comprehensive formulation consisting of proanthocyanidin, biotin, and coenzyme Q10. Probico addresses three primary causes of hair loss: amino acid deficiency, inadequate hair synthesis, and follicle inflammation, excluding the hormonal imbalance and blood circulation issues which require prescription medications.

== Chemical description ==
The key characteristics of the components of Probico are as follows:

=== Proanthocyanidin ===
Proanthocyanidin, a natural compound, particularly Proanthocyanidin B2, is highly impactful on hair and is abundantly found in Annurca apples. Research indicates that Proanthocyanidin influences the mitochondria in hair roots, stimulating them to generate ATP through the β-oxidation of fats, thus conserving amino acids for keratin synthesis. This results in the preservation of essential amino acids like glutamine and glycine, preventing their oxidation and promoting keratin synthesis and hair growth. Proanthocyanidin also increases the expression of VEGFA (Vascular Endothelial Growth Factor A) and FGF-7 (Fibroblast Growth Factor-7), transitioning hair follicles from the resting phase to the growth phase, thereby increasing hair thickness and density. Additionally, it preserves follicular cell viability by significantly controlling oxidative stress and limiting cell oxidative damage.

=== Biotin ===
Biotin, also known as Vitamin B7, is a water-soluble vitamin that is rapidly excreted and easily degraded. Humans and other multicellular eukaryotes cannot synthesize biotin directly, making continuous supplementation essential to prevent deficiency. Biotin is crucial in fatty acid synthesis, protein synthesis, nucleic acid synthesis, and the carbon-adding reactions in glucose metabolism, all vital for metabolic processes, including hair synthesis. A deficiency in biotin can lead to dermatitis, growth cessation, hair weakening, and hair loss. However, excessive intake can cause acne.

=== Coenzyme Q10 ===
Coenzyme Q10, also known as ubiquinone, is a non-protein, non-polar molecule. With age, its biosynthesis decreases, necessitating supplementation through diet or supplements. It plays a crucial role in the electron transport chain during cellular respiration, producing ATP and exhibiting antioxidant properties. Coenzyme Q10 reduces inflammation in hair follicles, decreases cardiovascular diseases like atherosclerosis and angina, and inhibits the expression of the pro-inflammatory cytokines TNF-α (Tumor Necrosis Factor-α) and IL-6 (Interleukin 6). It also works synergistically with Vitamin E and Vitamin C to maintain antioxidant functions, thus it is recommended to take Coenzyme Q10 with these vitamins for optimal benefits.
