= Periocular injection =

Medicine delivery method via the eye

Schematic diagram of the human eye showing.

Periocular injection is an ocular route of drug administration. It is well-established route of treatment for severe uveitis and cystoid macular edema (CME) by using corticosteroids.

Subconjunctival injection is one of periocular routes of administration.
