= Macular edema =

- Other names: Macular oedema, familial macular edema
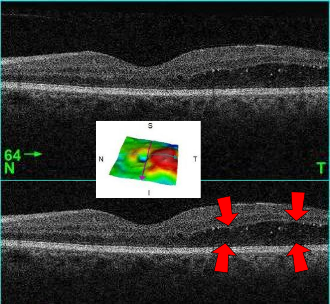
- A 61-year-old man with medical history of type 2 diabetes that presents a macular edema, evidenced by an OCT (the edema marked with arrows). The central image is a 3D reconstruction of the retinal thickness (the edema is coloured in red).
- Specialty: Ophthalmology

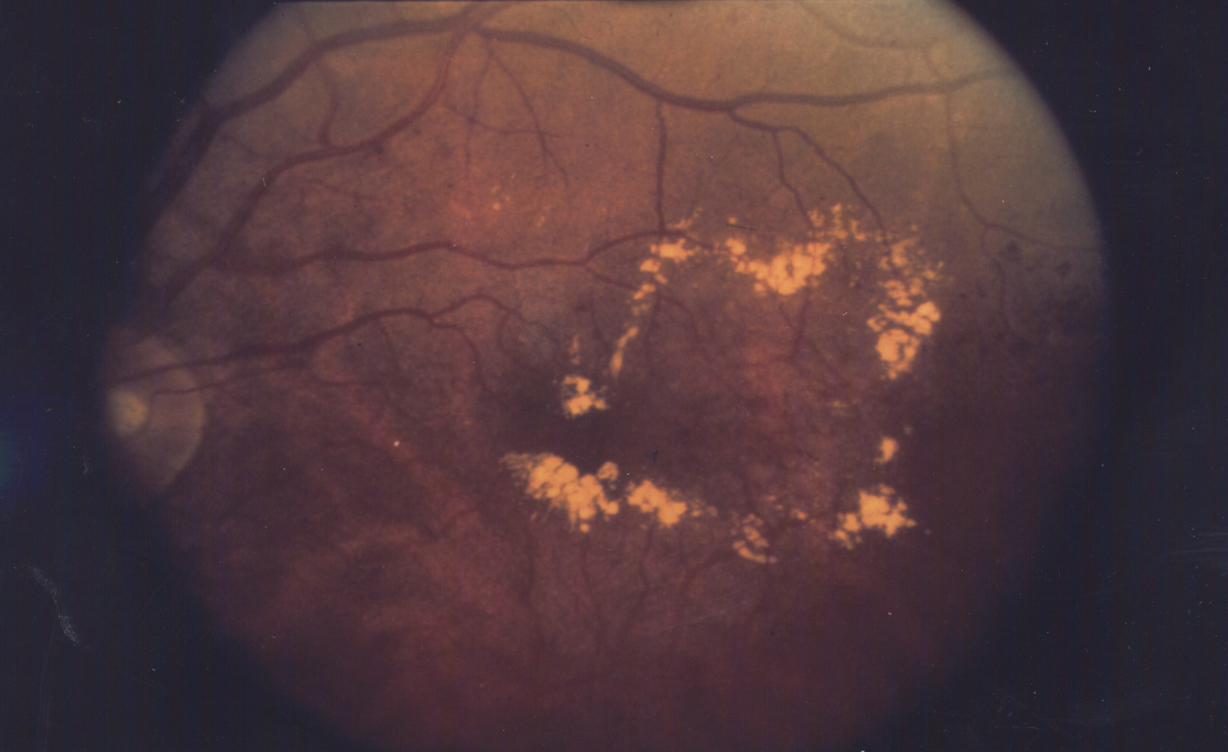
Diabetic macular edema, with hard exudates surrounding the blood vessels.

Macular edema occurs when fluid and protein deposits collect on or under the macula of the eye (a yellow central area of the retina) and causes it to thicken and swell (edema). The swelling may distort a person's central vision, because the macula holds tightly packed cones that provide sharp, clear, central vision to enable a person to see detail, form, and color that is directly in the centre of the field of view.

== Cause ==
The causes of macular edema are numerous and different causes may be inter-related.

- It is commonly associated with diabetes. Chronic or uncontrolled diabetes type 2 can affect peripheral blood vessels including those of the retina which may leak fluid, blood and occasionally fats into the retina causing it to swell.
- Age-related macular degeneration may cause macular edema. As individuals age there may be a natural deterioration in the macula which can lead to the depositing of drusen under the retina sometimes with the formation of abnormal blood vessels.
- Replacement of the lens as treatment for cataract can cause pseudophakic macular edema ('pseudophakia' means 'replacement lens'), also known as Irvine–Gass syndrome. The surgery involved sometimes irritates the retina (and other parts of the eye) causing the capillaries in the retina to dilate and leak fluid into the retina. This is less common today with modern lens replacement techniques.
- Chronic uveitis and intermediate uveitis can be a cause.
- Blockage of a vein in the retina can cause engorgement of the other retinal veins causing them to leak fluid under or into the retina. The blockage may be caused, among other things, by atherosclerosis, high blood pressure and glaucoma.
- A number of drugs can cause changes in the retina that can lead to macular edema. The effect of each drug is variable and some drugs have a lesser role in causation. The principal medications known to affect the retina are latanoprost, epinephrine, rosiglitazone, timolol and thiazolidinediones among others.
- A few congenital diseases are known to be associated with macular edema, for example retinitis pigmentosa and retinoschisis.

== Diagnosis ==
=== Classification ===
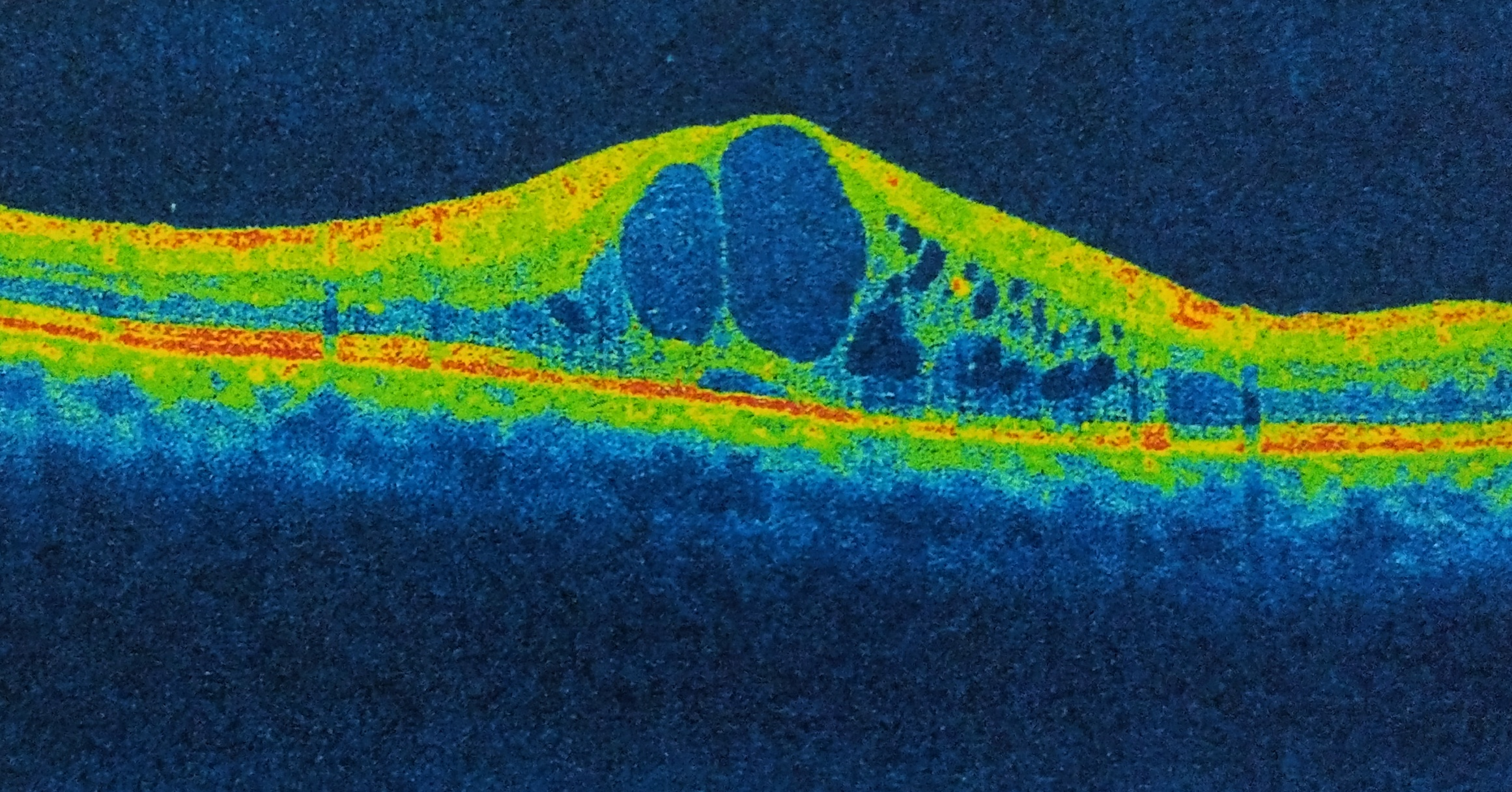
Cystoid macular edema (CME). There are intraretinal cystoid spaces

Cystoid macular edema (CME) involves fluid accumulation in the outer plexiform layer secondary to abnormal perifoveal retinal capillary permeability. The edema is termed "cystoid" as it appears cystic; however, lacking an epithelial coating, it is not truly cystic. The cause for CME can be remembered with the mnemonic "DEPRIVEN" (diabetes, epinepherine, pars planitis, retinitis pigmentosa, Irvine-Gass syndrome, venous occlusion, E2-prostaglandin analogues, nicotinic acid/niacin).

Diabetic macular edema (DME) is similarly caused by leaking macular capillaries. DME is the most common cause of visual loss in both proliferative, and non-proliferative diabetic retinopathy.

== Treatment ==
Macular edema sometimes occurs for a few days or weeks (sometimes even much longer) after cataract surgery, but most such cases can be successfully treated with NSAID or cortisone eye drops. Prophylactic use of Nonsteroidal anti-inflammatory drugs has been reported to reduce the risk of macular edema to some extent. Higher frequency use of topical steroids provides benefit in difficult to treat cases.

Diabetic macular edema may be treated with laser photocoagulation, reducing the chance of vision loss.

In 2010, the US FDA approved the use of Lucentis intravitreal injections for macular edema.

Iluvien, a sustained release intravitreal implant developed by Alimera Sciences, has been approved in Austria, Portugal and the U.K. for the treatment of vision impairment associated with chronic diabetic macular edema (DME) considered insufficiently responsive to available therapies. Additional EU country approvals are anticipated.

In 2013 Lucentis by intravitreal injection was approved by the National Institute for Health and Care Excellence in the UK for the treatment of macular edema caused by diabetes and/or retinal vein occlusion.

On July 29, 2014, Eylea (aflibercept), an intravitreal injection produced by Regeneron Pharmaceuticals Inc., was approved to treat DME in the United States. On January 28, 2022, Vabysmo, a different injectable eye medication produced by Genentech was approved to treat both Wet AMD and DME in the United States.

== Research ==
In 2005, steroids were investigated for the treatment of macular edema due to retinal blood vessel blockage such as CRVO and BRVO.

A 2014 Cochrane Systematic Review studied the effectiveness of two anti-VEGF treatments, ranibizumab and pegaptanib, on patients with macular edema caused by CRVO. Participants on both treatment groups showed a reduction in macular edema symptoms over six months.

Another Cochrane Review examined the effectiveness and safety of two intravitreal steroid treatments, triamcinolone acetonide and dexamethasone, for patients with from CRVO-ME. The results from one trial showed that patients treated with triamcinolone acetonide were significantly more likely to show improvements in visual acuity than those in the control group, though outcome data was missing for a large proportion of the control group. The second trial showed that patients treated with dexamethasone implants did not show improvements in visual acuity, compared to patients in the control group.

Intravitreal injections and implantation of steroids inside the eye may result in a small improvement of vision for people with chronic or refractory diabetic macular edema. There is low certainty evidence that there does not appear to be any additional benefit of combining anti-VEGF and intravitreal steroids when compared to either treatment alone.

Anti‐tumour necrosis factor agents have been proposed as a treatment for macular oedema due to uveitis but a Cochrane Review published in 2018 found no relevant randomised controlled trials.

== See also ==
- Diabetic retinopathy
- Fuchs spot
- Intermediate uveitis
- Macular telangiectasia
