= List of adverse effects of pazopanib =

This is a list of adverse effects of the anti-cancer drug pazopanib, sorted by frequency of occurrence.

== Very common ==
Very common (>10% incidence) adverse effects include:

- Reduced appetite
- Headache
- Taste changes
- High blood pressure (Note: Usually occurs within the first 18 weeks of treatment. 39% of cases develop within the first 9 days of treatment.)
- Diarrhoea
- Abdominal pain
- Nausea
- Vomiting
- Hair colour change
- Hand-foot syndrome
- Hair loss
- Rash
- Fatigue
- Increased alanine aminotransferase
- Increased aspartate aminotransferase
- Tumour pain^{‡}
- Myelosuppression^{‡} (Note: This includes leucopenia, thrombocytopenia and neutropenia.)
- Stomatitis^{‡}
- Exfoliative rash^{‡}
- Skin hyperpigmentation^{‡}
- Weight loss^{‡}

== Common ==
Common (1–10% incidence) adverse effects include:

- Tumour pain^{†}
- Myelosuppression^{†} (Note: This includes leucopenia, lymphopenia, thrombocytopenia and neutropenia.)
- Underactive thyroid
- Dehydration
- Low level of phosphate in the blood
- Dizziness
- Lethargy
- Paraesthesia
- Peripheral sensory neuropathy
- Blurred vision
- Hot flush
- Venous thromboembolic event
- Flushing
- Nose bleed
- Voice anomalies
- Shortness of breath
- Coughing up blood
- Stomatitis
- Indigestion
- Flatulence
- Abdominal distension
- Dry mouth
- Mouth ulceration
- Hyperbilirubinaemia
- Abnormal liver function
- Hepatotoxicity
- Skin hypopigmentation
- Dry skin
- Itchiness
- Erythema
- Skin depigmentation
- Hyperhidrosis
- Joint pain
- Muscle aches
- Muscle spasms
- Protein in the urine
- Mucosal inflammation
- Weakness
- Oedema
- Chest pain
- Weight loss^{†}
- Increased blood creatinine
- Lipase increased
- Decreased white blood cell count
- Blood TSH decreased
- Amylase increased
- Gamma-glutamyltransferase increased
- Increased blood pressure
- Increased blood urea
- Abnormal liver function test
- Gingival infection^{‡}
- Dizziness
- Insomnia
- Peripheral sensory neuropathy
- Heart dysfunction
- Blurred vision
- Low heart rate
- Left ventricular dysfunction
- Bleeding (including haemorrhage)
- High blood sugar
- Low blood sugar

== Uncommon ==
Uncommon (0.1–1% incidence) adverse effects include:

- Torsades de pointes
- Heart failure
- Liver failure
- GI perforation (may be fatal)
- Fistula formation

== Rare ==
Rare (<0.1% incidence) adverse effects include:

- Reversible posterior leukoencephalopathy syndrome

== Notes ==
^{†} Denotes side effects seen at the above frequency only in clinical trials performed in people with renal cell carcinoma.

^{‡} Denotes side effects seen at the above frequency only in clinical trials done in people with soft tissue sarcomas.
