= Cediranib =

Chemical compound

Clinical data
- Routes of administration: Oral
- ATC code: L01EK02 (WHO)

Pharmacokinetic data
- Elimination half-life: 12 to 35 hours

Identifiers
- IUPAC name: 4-[(4-fluoro-2-methyl-1H-indol-5-yl)oxy]-6-methoxy-7-[3-(pyrrolidin-1-yl)propoxy]quinazoline
- CAS Number: 288383-20-0
- PubChem CID: 9933475
- IUPHAR/BPS: 5664
- ChemSpider: 8109103
- UNII: NQU9IPY4K9
- KEGG: D08881
- ChEMBL: ChEMBL491473
- CompTox Dashboard (EPA): DTXSID10183035
- ECHA InfoCard: 100.196.628

Chemical and physical data
- Formula: C_{25}H_{27}FN_{4}O_{3}
- Molar mass: 450.514 g·mol^{−1}
- 3D model (JSmol): Interactive image
- SMILES: COc4cc3c(Oc2ccc1[nH]c(C)cc1c2F)ncnc3cc4OCCCN5CCCC5
- InChI: InChI=1S/C25H27FN4O3/c1-16-12-17-19(29-16)6-7-21(24(17)26)33-25-18-13-22(31-2)23(14-20(18)27-15-28-25)32-11-5-10-30-8-3-4-9-30/h6-7,12-15,29H,3-5,8-11H2,1-2H3; Key:XXJWYDDUDKYVKI-UHFFFAOYSA-N

Cediranib (AZD-2171; tentative trade name Recentin) is a potent inhibitor of vascular endothelial growth factor (VEGF) receptor tyrosine kinases.

The drug is being developed by AstraZeneca as a possible anti-cancer chemotherapeutic agent for oral administration.

== Clinical trials ==
Beginning in 2007, it underwent phase I clinical trials for the treatment of non-small cell lung cancer, kidney cancer, and colorectal cancer in adults, as well as tumors of the central nervous system in children. Phase I trials of interactions with other drugs used in cancer treatment were also undertaken.

On February 27, 2008, AstraZeneca announced that the use of cediranib in non-small cell lung cancer will not progress into phase III after failing to meet its main goal. On 8 March 2010, AstraZeneca issued a press-release stating that cediranib had failed Phase III clinical trials for use in first-line metastatic colorectal cancer when it was compared clinically with the market-leader bevacizumab. In 2016, AstraZeneca completed a phase III trial comparing the efficacy of cediranib alone and cediranib with lomustine to the efficacy of lomustine alone in patients with recurrent glioblastoma. The trial failed to meet its primary endpoint and survival was not extended with cediranib.

== Combination trials ==
Findings from a federally funded, NCI-sponsored phase II clinical trial presented at the 50th Annual Meeting of the American Society of Clinical Oncology (May 30 - June 3, 2014, Chicago, Ill; Abstract No: LBA5500), show that the combination of two investigational oral drugs, olaparib, a PARP inhibitor, and cediranib is significantly more active against recurrent, platinum chemotherapy-sensitive disease or ovarian cancer related to mutations in BRCA genes than olaparib alone.
