= Intravitreal administration =

Route of administration

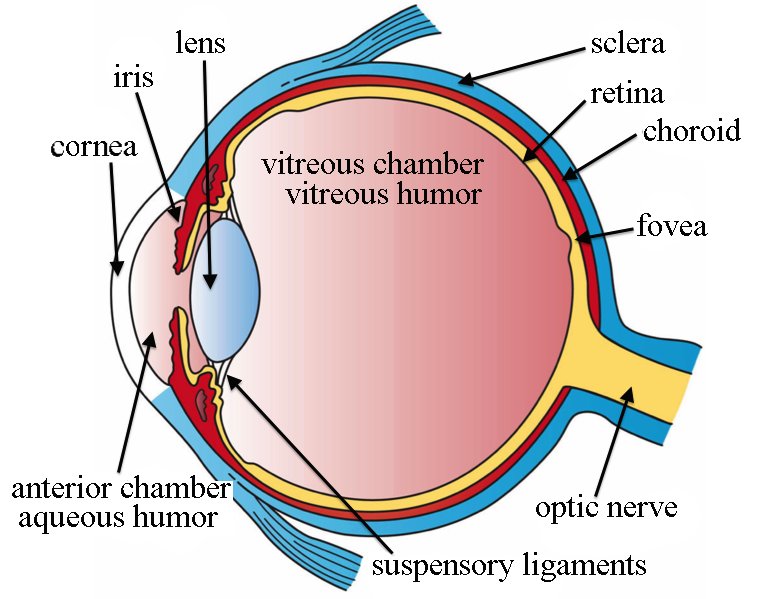
Intravitreal administration delivers substances directly into the vitreous chamber.

Intravitreal administration is a route of administration of a drug, or other substance, in which the substance is delivered into the vitreous humor of the eye. "Intravitreal" literally means "inside an eye". Intravitreal injection is the method of administration of drugs into the eye by injection with a fine needle. The medication will be directly applied into the vitreous humor. It is used to treat various eye diseases, such as age-related macular degeneration (AMD), diabetic retinopathy, and infections inside the eye such as endophthalmitis. As compared to topical administration, this method is beneficial for a more localized delivery of medications to the targeted site, as the needle can directly pass through the anatomical eye barrier (e.g. cornea, conjunctiva and lens) and dynamic barrier (e.g. tears and aqueous humor). It could also minimize adverse drug effects on other body tissues via the systemic circulation, which could be a possible risk for intravenous injection of medications. Although there are risks of infections or other complications, with suitable precautions throughout the injection process, chances for these complications could be lowered.

Intravitreal injections were first introduced in 1911 when Ohm gave an injection of air into the vitreous humor to repair a detached retina. In the mid-1940s, intravitreal injections became a standard way to administer drugs to treat endophthalmitis and cytomegalovirus retinitis.

== Epidemiology ==
Intravitreal injections were proposed over a century ago, however the number performed remained relatively low until the mid 2000s. Until 2001, intravitreal injections were mainly used to treat end-ophthalmitis. The number of intravitreal injections stayed fairly constant, around 4,500 injections per year in the US. The number of injections tripled to 15,000 in 2002, when triamcinolone injections were first used to treat diabetic macular oedema. This use continued to drive an increase to 83,000 injections in 2004. In 2005, bevacizumab and ranibizumab intravitreal injections for the treatment of wet-AMD caused a rise in injections to 252,000. In 2008, over 1 million intravitreal injections were performed. This doubled to 2 million just 3 years later in 2011 when aflibercept (another anti-VEGF intravitreal injection) became available for the treatment of wet AMD. Intravitreal injections hit an all-time high in 2016, reaching over 5.9 million injections in the US.

== History ==
Intravitreal injection was first mentioned in a study in 1911, in which the injection of air was used to repair a detached retina. There were also investigations evaluating intravitreal antibiotics injection using sulfanilamide and penicillin to treat endophthalmitis in the 1940s, yet due to the inconsistency of results and safety concerns, this form of drug delivery was only for experimental use and not applied in patients. It was until 1998, that fomivirsen (Vitravene), the first intravitreal administered medication, was approved by the U.S. Food and Drug Administration (FDA).

In 2004, when Aiello et al. published the first guidelines for intravitreal injection in the journal Retina, fomivirsen was still the only medication licensed by the FDA for intravitreal injection. At the end of the year, on December 17, the first intravitreal anti-VEGF drug pegaptanib (Macugen) was also licensed by FDA for treatment of wet age-related macular degeneration (wet AMD).

Intravitreal injection has then become more common and a surge in the number of injections performed could be seen. Six extra medications, namely triamcinolone acetonide, ranibizumab (Lucentis), aflibercept (Eylea/Zaltrap), dexamethasone, ocriplasmin and fluocinolone acetonide were approved for this injection by the end of 2014. There are also increasing off-label use of bevacizumab (Avastin) for the management of various ophthalmologic diseases, like AMD, retinal vein occlusion and diabetic macular edema. On top of that, the number of intravitreal injections has escalated from less than 3000 per year in 1999, to an estimation of near 6 million in 2016.

== Uses ==
Intravitreal injection is used to inject a drug into the eye to reduce inflammation (anti-inflammatory), inhibit the growth and development of new blood vessels (angiostatic), or lower the permeability of blood vessels (anti-permeability), in turn curing various eye diseases.

Disorders/diseases that can be treated with intravitreal injection include:

- Age-related macular degeneration (AMD)/ Macular Degeneration: An eye disorder that slowly destroys sharp, central vision
- Uveitis: Swelling and inflammation within the eyeball
- Retinal vein occlusion: A blockage of the veins that carry blood away from the retina, the back part of your eye, and out of the eye
- Macular edema: Swelling or thickening of the macula (the central area of the retina that provides sharp, central vision) due to abnormal fluid accumulation
  - Diabetic macular edema: Poorly controlled diabetes mellitus could lead to diabetic retinopathy, i.e., damages to the retina. The damage to the small blood vessels there causes leakage of fluid
  - Pseudophakic cystoid macular edema
  - Macular edema secondary to retinal vein occlusion
  - Macular edema secondary to uveitis
- Infections, such as endophthalmitis and retinitis
- Noninfectious vitritis

Sometimes, an intravitreal injection of antibiotics and steroids is given as part of routine cataract surgery. This avoids having to use drops after surgery.

=== Antimicrobials ===
Antimicrobials are intravitreally injected to treat eye infections, such as endophthalmitis and retinitis. The medication used depends on the pathogen responsible for the disease.

==== Antibiotics ====
This type of drug targets on bacterial infection. The first use of intravitreal antibiotics was dated back to experiments in the 1940s, in which penicillin and sulfonamides were used to treat the rabbit endophthalmitis models. Later, more studies proved the beneficial effects of intravitreal antibiotics on acute postoperative endophthalmitis. In the 1970s, Peyman's research on the suggested doses for the medications was published. Intravitreal antibiotics then has gradually become the major treatment to manage bacterial endophthalmitis. Some common antibiotics administered nowadays are vancomycin (for Gram-positive bacteria) and ceftazidime (for Gram-negative bacteria).

The dosage of antibiotics injected intravitreally is usually low to avoid possible retina toxicity. Some alternative antibiotics have also been tested to replace those that have a higher risk of causing macular toxicity (e.g. aminoglycosides). In light of the raised occurrence of antibiotics resistance, the medications should be chosen and evaluated with the support of bacterial culture and antibiotics sensitivity test results. Sometimes, combinations of different antibiotics may be needed to treat polymicrobial infections (infections that are caused by more than one type of microorganisms), or as an empirical treatment.

Antibiotics, such as moxifloxacin, vancomycin, etc., are used perioperatively and postoperatively as a common method of endophthalmitis prevention in cataract surgery. Researches show such injection of antibiotics is more useful to prevent infection as compared to chemoprophylaxis(chemoprevention) given topically. However, it has recently been controversial whether it has sufficient efficacy for endophthalmitis prophylaxis, and whether it improves the effectiveness in preventing endophthalmitis by perioperative povidone-iodine when used in combination with the antiseptic.

==== Antifungals ====
If the endophthalmitis is suspected to be a fungal infection, antifungals, such as amphotericin B and voriconazole, could be intravitreally injected to treat the disease. Although amphotericin B has a broad spectrum, voriconazole is more commonly used now as it has a higher efficacy and lower toxicity.

==== Antivirals ====
Since the 1990s, intravitreal antivirals have been used to treat cytomegalovirus retinitis (CMV retinitis) in immunodeficient patients, such as AIDS patients. Some medications that could be used include ganciclovir, foscarnet, and cidofovir. The amount and frequency of the intravitreal agent injected varies among the drug chosen: for example, foscarnet has to be given more frequently than ganciclovir as it has a shorter intravitreal half-life. If the traditional antiviral therapy fails, a combination of these two medications may be injected. On the other hand, antiviral drugs could also be administered for patients with acute retinal necrosis due to varicella-zoster virus retinitis.

=== Anti-VEGF ===
The most common reason intravitreal injections are used is to administer anti-vascular endothelial growth factor (anti-VEGF) therapies to treat wet age related macular degeneration (AMD) and diabetic retinopathy. Both of these conditions cause damage to the retina leading to vision loss. There are three widely used Anti-VEGF drugs to treat these conditions: ranibizumab (Lucentis; Genentech), bevacizumab (Avastin; Genentech), and aflibercept (Eylea; Regeneron Pharmaceuticals). Bevacizumab has not been FDA approved to treat wet AMD, however in the US it is the first line anti-VEGF therapy for over half of ophthalmologists due to its efficacy and drastically lower cost. These three drugs bind to VEGF molecules preventing them from binding to VEGF receptors on the surface of endothelial cells thereby stopping the abnormal angiogenesis that causes wet AMD. All three of these therapies have vastly improved outcomes for sufferers who had limited treatment options prior to their invention but must be administered via intravitreal injection.

Vascular endothelial growth factor (VEGF) is a type of protein the body cells produce to stimulate the growth of new blood vessels. Anti-VEGF agents are chemicals that could inhibit these growth factors to reduce or prevent the abnormal growth of blood vessels, which could lead to damage to the eye and vision.

=== Steroids ===
Steroids may be administered via intravitreal injection to treat diabetic and vasculo-occlusive macular edema, exudative macular degeneration, pseudophakic cystoid macular edema, and posterior uveitis. Common steroids used to treat these conditions include dexamethasone and triamcinolone acetonide (Triescence, Alcon Laboratories, Inc.). Steroid implants, such as the dexamethasone implant (Ozurdex, Allergan, Inc.), are used for long-term treatment of macular edema. Both of these steroid work by modulating inflammatory cytokines.

The primary use of the corticosteroids is to reduce the inflammation by inhibiting the inflammatory cytokines. It could be used to treat numerous eye disorders, such as diabetic retinopathy and retinal vein occlusion.

Below are some examples of this type of medication:

==== Triamcinolone acetonide ====
Triamcinolone acetonide is one of the most commonly used steroid agents for the treatment of several retinal conditions. The drug is often seen as an ester in commercial drugs and appears as a white- to cream-colored crystalline powder. It is much more soluble in alcohol than in water, which could be the reason for its longer duration of action (around 3 months after 4 mg intravitreal injection of the drug). The drug is also 5 times more potent than hydrocortisone while only has a tenth of its sodium-retaining potency.

It has proven to be effective for the management of abnormal endothelial cell proliferation-associated disorders, and the accumulation of intraretinal and subretinal fluid.

==== Dexamethasone ====
Dexamethasone is a potent cytokine inhibitor that is naturally released from human pericytes. It is shown to be able to significantly decrease intercellular adhesion molecule-1 mRNA and protein levels and therefore reduce leukostasis and help maintain the blood-retinal-barrier. Its potency is 5 times greater than triamcinolone acetonide. Due to its relatively short half-life, the medication is often given as an intravitreal implant for a continuous and stable release to the target site. Some newly developed dexamethasone implants, such as Ozurdex, are made from biodegradable materials that could be intravitreally injected rather than surgically implanted.

This corticosteroid is usually used to treat disorders and diseases including macular edema secondary to retinal vein occlusion, pseudophakic cystoid macular edema, macular edema secondary to uveitis, diabetic macular edema, and age-related macular degeneration.

==== Fluocinolone acetonide ====
Fluocinolone acetonide is a synthetic corticosteroid as potent as dexamethasone, but with a much lower water solubility, which could be accounted for the extended period of release from the intravitreal implant injected. It was also proven to have a localized effect in the posterior segment of the eye and is not absorbed into the systemic circulation, thus less likely to give rise to systemic adverse effect.

The medication could be used in treatment for noninfectious posterior uveitis and diabetic macular edema, while applications in the management of other ophthalmic diseases are still under research.

=== Gene therapy drugs ===
Intravitreal gene therapy is a technique for treating retinal diseases by delivering therapeutic genes directly into the eye's vitreous humor using a viral vector, typically an adeno-associated virus (AAV). This approach enables retinal cells to produce beneficial proteins, potentially offering long-term or permanent treatment for conditions such as wet age-related macular degeneration (AMD), diabetic macular edema, and inherited retinal dystrophies while reducing the need for frequent injections. Gene therapy drugs such as lenadogene nolparvovec (Lumevoq) for Leber's hereditary optic neuropathy are examples of gene therapies delivered intravitreally. These are essentially recombinant viral vectors, containing the gene required for the therapy.

== Adverse events and complications ==
Side effects of intravitreal injection can be classified into two categories: drug-related side effects and injection-related side effects. For example, in an intravitreal steroid injection, complications could be divided into steroid-related adverse effects and injection-related adverse effects, in which the former most commonly include cataract formation and increase in intraocular pressure (IOP).

Endophthalmitis, or a bacterial infection within the eye causing inflammation of the sclera, is one of the most severe complications due to intravitreal injections. Incidence of endophthalmitis after intravitreal injection per patient has been reported to range from 0.019 to 1.6%. Endophthalmitis can also result in white or yellow discharge inside the eyelid, and a white, cloudy cornea. A layer of white blood cells called hypopyon may develop between the iris and the cornea. Endophthalmitis is considered an ophthalmological emergency and requires immediate treatment in many cases. It is treated with injections of antibiotics and antifungal compounds as appropriate. In severe cases a vitrectomy, or removal of vitreous humor, may be required to surgically remove infectious debris.

Another complication of intravitreal medication administration is inflammation. Intraocular inflammation is one of the main causes of temporary pain and vision loss after an intravitreal injection. Severe inflammation can cause permanent damage to the eye. The risk of inflammation varies based on the specific drug being administered. One clinical trial of ranibizumab for age-related macular degeneration administered intravitreally reported intraocular inflammation rates between 1.4% and 2.9%. Bevacizumab, another medication for the same purpose, resulted in an incidence between 0.09% and 0.4%.

Rhegmatogenous retinal detachment, when the retina breaks allowing vitreous fluid to leak into the subretinal space, resulting from intravitreal injection is rare, occurring at most in 0.67% of people. This fluid can cause sensory tissues to detach from the retina, thus losing their source of nutrition, and slowly killing the cells.

Subconjunctival hemorrhage is the most common type of hemorrhage following intravitreal injection with a reported incidence of nearly 10% of injections. People taking aspirin may be at higher risk for hemorrhage after intravitreal injection. Choroidal hemorrhage and subretinal hemorrhage are less common than subconjunctival hemorrhage, but both have been reported to occur following intravitreal injection.

At least one study has noted that up to 8.6% of intravitreal injections may be administered in the incorrect eye. Factors may lead to a person identifying the wrong eye for self-administration include length of time since last injection and previous injections in both eyes.

Other examples of potential adverse effects are listed as follows:

- Discomfort and pain in the injection sites
- Bleeding (e.g. subconjunctival, vitreous or retinal hemorrhage)
- Vitreous reflux (the reflux of fluid from the vitreous cavity, which contains a mixture of vitreous humor and the drug administered)
- Floaters (black/grey spots, small shapes or string in vision)
- Infectious endophthalmitis
- Pseudoendophthalmitis
- Ocular hypertension, i.e. increase in intraocular pressure (IOP)
- Cataract (when the needle accidentally hits the lens), or other damage to lens
- Rhegmatogenous retinal detachment
- Toxic effects of medication

A surgery may be required to treat certain severe complications. Some of the above complications could also lead to blindness, or even loss of the eye (in the case of a severe infection).

== Precautions ==
Precautions should be taken before, during, and after the injection to lower the chances of complications, particularly infection prevention:

=== Pre-treatment ===
- Topical antiseptic usage is important to aid in preventing potential bacterial infections. Common antiseptics used in practice include povidone-iodine (primarily for reducing the risk of endophthalmitis) and chlorhexidine (predominantly to counteract adverse effects caused by povidone-iodine in the aqueous form).
- Pre-injection antibiotics might be given to support the topical antiseptic in preventing potential bacterial infections.
- Hand sterilization to significantly reduce microorganisms present on the hands of the physician prior to the injection.
- Sterile gloves should be used in combination with the aforementioned hand washing for the same reasons.
- Collection of comprehensive information of the patient on health problems, allergies, bleeding tendencies, and medicines taken (including any over-the-counter medicines) to avoid preventable complications.

=== During the injection ===
- Masks, drapes, and silence (i.e. the physician and others near the patient should not talk) in order to minimize contamination through the air resulting from respiratory or nasal droplets.

=== Post-treatment ===
- Post-injection antibiotics may given to prevent potential bacterial infection, but are usually not included in standard procedures of intravitreal injection. Some studies show that such practice has no statistically significant benefit in preventing endophthalmitis, whereas other studies indicate that doing so can increase chances of conjunctival bacterial resistance.
- Rubbing of eyes and swimming should be avoided for several days after the injection.
- Eye pain or discomfort, redness, light sensitivity or changes in vision should be reported to the physician that performed the intravitreal injection.

== Procedure and guidelines ==
In 2004 with the rise of intravitreal injections, a group of experts established the first general guidelines for administering intravitreal injections. Until an update in 2014 these were consensus guidelines in the US. In 2014 a panel of 16 health professionals with expertise in different aspects of the injection reviewed and revised the original guidelines. Together they released areas of general agreement, areas with no clear consensus, and recommended sequence of steps for intravitreal injection.

=== Changes from 2004 guidance ===
==== Dropped recommendations from 2004 ====
Use of a lid speculum is no longer essential. Now a lid speculum, manual lid retraction or a similar maneuver can be used to keep the eyelids out of the way during the procedure.

The strong 2004 consensus that the pupil should be routinely dilated to examine the posterior segment of the eye post injection was dropped. Some of the 2014 panelists did not dilate the pupil for routine injections while others found this examination to be highly important. As no consensus was reached this recommendation was dropped from the 2014 guidance.

==== New recommendations in 2014 ====
In 2004, the committee did not come to a consensus on routine use of pre-, peri- or postinjection antibiotics. Since then, evidence has emerged suggesting that peri-injection antibiotics do not meaningfully lower the risk of post-injection infection and periodic multi-day administration of topical ophthalmic antibiotics facilitates the colonization of drug-resistant bacteria. For these reasons, in 2014, the committee decided against recommending routine antibiotics.

The new guidelines include hand washing and glove use consistent with the modern-day medical practice of universal precautions. Although the use of gloves was agreed upon by the committee, some panelists cited studies showing no impact of glove use on endophthalmitis rate.

In 2004, the topic of droplet contamination was not addressed. Since then, new evidence has come to light showing that streptococcal species cause a disproportionate number of post intravitreal injection endophthalmitis cases compared to other forms of ocular surgery. This is likely due to aerosolized droplet contamination from either the practitioners' or patients' mouth. The 2014 guidelines were updated to address these findings, recommending both clinicians and patients wear face masks during the procedure.

The new guidelines recommend monitoring intraocular pressure both pre- and post-injection. This recommendation stemmed from new evidence showing that routine intravitreal administration of anti-VEGF therapies may increase intraocular pressure for a sustained time period.

The 2014 guidelines addressed bilateral injections done in the same visit. The committee recommended treating each eye as a separate procedure and use different lots or batches of medication whenever possible. The panel was not able to support the use of sterile drapes in the procedure, as retrospective studies showed no increased rate of endophthalmitis in injections done without drapes.

=== Injection site ===
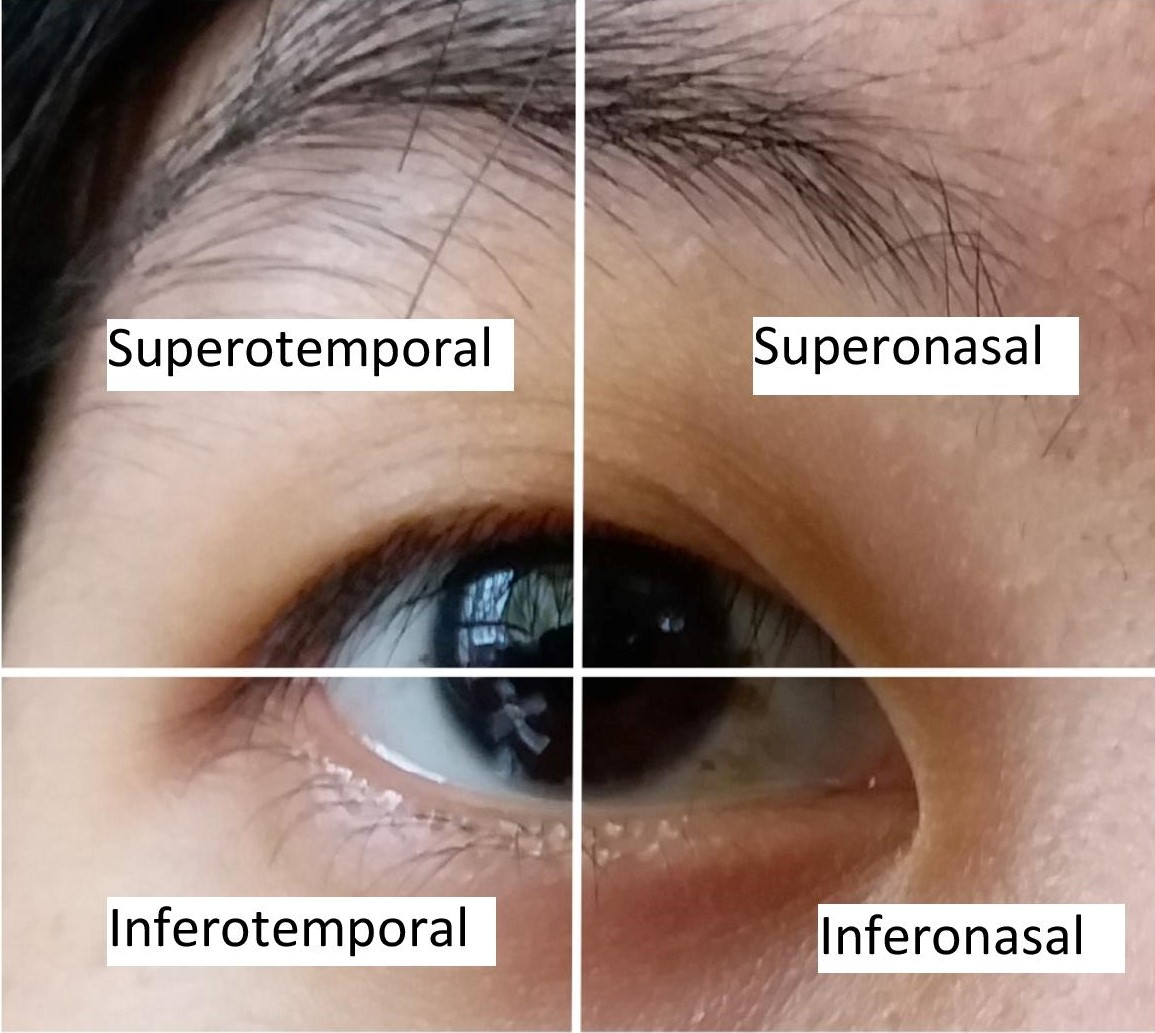
A photo of a right eye divided into 4 quadrants: superotemporal, superonasal, inferotemporal, and inferonasal.

The injection is usually done at the inferotemporal quadrant (i.e., the lower quadrant away from the nose) of the eye undergoing the procedure, as it is usually more accessible. However, depending on the eye's condition, patient's and the ophthalmologist's preference, other regions could also be used.

Patient with aphakic (without lens due to cataract surgery), or pseudophakic eye (with implanted lens after removal of natural lens) would have the injection 3.0-3.5 mm posterior to the limbus, while injection to the phakic eye (with natural lens) is done 3.5-4.0 mm posterior to the limbus.

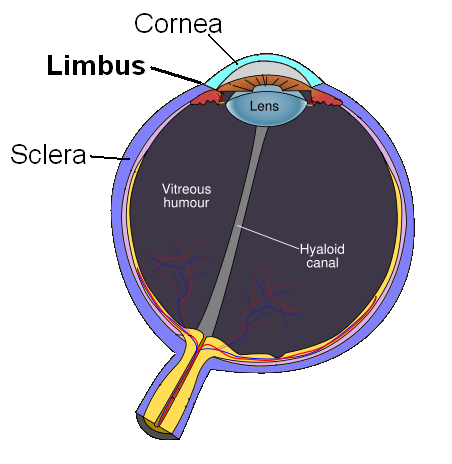
An anatomical diagram showing the limbus of the eye.

=== Location ===
Like many injections, intravitreal injection is commonly performed in the office setting. An operation room may be a better option to provide a more sterile environment for the procedure to lower the chance of infections, yet it will also increase the costs. Since the occurrence of serious post-injection infection (e.g., endophthalmitis) is low, in-office intravitreal injection is preferred.

=== Steps ===
The exact procedures and techniques of the intravitreal injection varies among different guidelines, and may depend on the practices of the person performing the injection. Below is an example of the steps for the injection:

The patient usually leans back on the chair (in supine position), in which the headrest is stable and the patient is comfortable. Sterile drape is sometimes used to cover the face of the patient and only show the eye for the injection.

The specialist first applies anesthetics to the eye and eyelid to numb the area, so that the patient will not feel the pain during the procedure. The type of anesthetic used depends on the practitioner practices and the patient's history. Some common forms of anesthetic used are eye drops (e.g. tetracaine/proparacaine) or gel (e.g. lidocaine 2% or 4% jelly), which is applied topically. Other choices of anesthesia include the use of lidocaine soaked pledget (a small cotton or wool pad) and subconjunctival injection (injection under the conjunctiva) of anesthetic agents. However, the latter may cause a raised chance of subconjunctival hemorrhage. Sometimes, for an eye with inflammation, a retrobulbar block may be given, but usually the topical or subconjunctival anesthesia is sufficient. The anesthetic takes time to show the numbing effect, ranging from 1–5 minutes, depending on the chemical chosen.

The specialist then sterilizes the eye and the surrounding area, often with povidone-iodine (PVP-I) solution, to prevent any infection in the injected site. Aqueous chlorhexidine is used instead in case of adverse effects to povidone-iodine.

Next, an eyelid speculum is placed to retract the eyelids and thus hold the eye open. It helps to prevent contamination of the needle and the injection site by the eyelid or eyelashes. Povidone-iodine solution is applied to the conjunctiva at the site of injection. Another dose of local anesthetic may be given to the conjunctival surface again (for example, by placing a cotton swab soaked with the anesthetic drug solution over the targeted region), which is followed by the reapplication of PVP-I solution.

The injection site is measured and marked with a measuring caliper or other devices. The patient is then told to look away from the injection site to show the quadrant to be injected, and the doctor inserts the needle at the target site in a single motion into the mid-vitreous cavity. Once the needle is in the vitreous cavity, the doctor pushes the plunger to release the drug into the cavity. After that, the needle is removed, and the injection site is immediately covered with a cotton swab to avoid vitreous reflux (reflux of fluid from the vitreous cavity). The excess PVP-I solution is rinsed away.

Finally, the doctor checks the patient's vision and intraocular pressure (IOP) of the eye. The injection of certain medications, such as triamcinolone acetonide (Kenalog or Triesence), may cause a sudden increase in the IOP, and the patient should be monitored until the pressure returns to a normal level. If a large volume of drug is injected, paracentesis may be required.

== Repeated injections ==
Treatments administered via intravitreal injection are not cures and therefore repeated injections are necessary for managing conditions. For example, anti-VEGF therapies must be injected monthly or bi-monthly for the rest of their lives in order to treat wet age related macular degeneration. A growing body of evidence has shown repeat intravitreal injections have their own increased risks and complications.

A 3× rise in intraocular pressure after an intravitreal injection is expected and usually only lasts a few minutes. Studies have shown an increased risk of sustained elevated intraocular pressure due to repeated intravitreal injections. Elevated intraocular pressure leads to tissue damage, this is how glaucoma damages the eye. Many theories as to why this is have been postulated however many focus on the effect of the repeated eye trauma. The risk of elevated intraocular pressure is so great that it is recommended clinicians monitor intraocular pressure before and after intravitreal injection. Mount Sinai researchers have developed a method to measure retina damage from long term intravitreal injection using optimal coherence tomography angiography (OCTA). OCTA captures the motion of red blood cells in blood vessels noninvasively allowing researchers to measure blood flow in the macula and optic nerve. From this data they were able to show areas of cumulative damage.

== Potential alternatives ==
Intravitreal injections have vastly improved outcomes for patients with retinal diseases however the risk and patient burden associated with repeated injections has prompted researchers to pursue less invasive methods of application. There has been significant emphasis on finding methods to administer treatments topically over the last 50 years. This research has garnered more attention thanks to the increase in intravitreal injections and the growing evidence linking repeat injections to adverse events.

== See also ==
- Eye drops
- Eye surgery
- Intravitreal Gene Therapy
- Ophthalmology
