= Botaretigene sparoparvovec =

Experimental gene therapy

Botaretigene sparoparvovec (AAV5-RPGR) is an experimental gene therapy for X-linked retinitis pigmentosa developed by Janssen Pharmaceuticals.
