= Subconjunctival injection =

Medicine delivery method to the eye

Schematic diagram of the human eye showing.

Subconjunctival injection is a type of periocular route of injection for ocular drug administration by administration of a medication either under the conjunctiva or underneath the conjunctiva lining the eyelid.

Using the subconjunctival injection bypasses the fatty layers of the bulbous conjunctiva and putting medications adjacent to sclera that is permeable to water, this will increase the penetration of the water-soluble drug into the eye.

This route is indicated for treatment of different lesions, such as in the cornea, sclera, anterior uvea and vitreous.

Antibiotics and corticosteroids can be administered by this route.
