= Ranibizumab =

Pharmaceutical drug

Monoclonal antibody
- Type: Fab fragment
- Source: Humanized (from mouse)
- Target: Vascular endothelial growth factor A (VEGF-A)

Clinical data
- Trade names: Lucentis, others
- Biosimilars: ranibizumab-blrz, ranibizumab-eqrn, ranibizumab-hkdz, ranibizumab-leyk, ranibizumab-nuna Byooviz, Cimerli, Epruvy, Lucamzi, Nufymco, Ranivisio, Raniviz, Ranluspec, Ranopto, Rexatilux, Rimmyrah, Vislyfa, Ximluci
- AHFS/Drugs.com: Monograph
- MedlinePlus: a607044
- License data: US DailyMed: Ranibizumab
- Pregnancy category: AU: D
- Routes of administration: Intravitreal injection
- ATC code: S01LA04 (WHO)

Legal status
- Legal status: AU: S4 (Prescription only); CA: ℞-only / Schedule D; UK: POM (Prescription only); US: ℞-only; EU: Rx-only

Pharmacokinetic data
- Elimination half-life: Approx. 9 days

Identifiers
- CAS Number: 347396-82-1
- DrugBank: DB01270
- ChemSpider: none
- UNII: ZL1R02VT79
- KEGG: D05697
- ChEMBL: ChEMBL1201825

Chemical and physical data
- Formula: C_{2158}H_{3282}N_{562}O_{681}S_{12}
- Molar mass: 48379.97 g·mol^{−1}

Ranibizumab, sold under the brand name Lucentis among others, is a monoclonal antibody fragment (Fab) created from the same parent mouse antibody as bevacizumab. It is an anti-angiogenic that is approved to treat the "wet" type of age-related macular degeneration (AMD, also ARMD), diabetic retinopathy, and macular edema due to branch retinal vein occlusion or central retinal vein occlusion.

Ranibizumab was developed by Genentech and marketed by them in the United States, and elsewhere by Novartis, under the brand name Lucentis. Ranibizumab (Lucentis) was approved for medical use in the United States in June 2006, and in the European Union in January 2007.

== Medical uses ==
In the United States, ranibizumab is indicated for the treatment of neovascular (wet) age-related macular degeneration, macular edema following retinal vein occlusion, diabetic macular edema, diabetic retinopathy, and myopic choroidal neovascularization.

In the European Union, ranibizumab is indicated for the treatment of neovascular (wet) age-related macular degeneration, visual impairment due to diabetic macular edema, proliferative diabetic retinopathy, visual impairment due to macular edema secondary to retinal vein occlusion, and visual impairment due to choroidal neovascularisation.

It is used for age-related wet macular degeneration. Its effectiveness is similar to that of bevacizumab and aflibercept. A 2023 systematic review update found that while ranibizumab and bevacizumab provide similar functional outcomes in diabetic macular edema, there is low-certainty evidence suggesting that ranibizumab is more effective in reducing central retinal thickness than bevacizumab.

Susvimo is a reformulation of ranibizumab suitable for injection via ocular implant. Susvimo was approved for medical use in the United States in October 2021.

== Side effects ==
A 2014 Cochrane review did not find a difference between bevacizumab and ranibizumab in deaths or total severe side effects when used for macular degeneration. There, however, was not a lot of evidence, and thus this conclusion is not that certain.

Ranibizumab does appear to result in a lower risk of stomach and intestinal problems. It is also associated with a low rate of eye related side effects.

Serious adverse events related to the injection procedure occurred with an incidence rate of less than 1% and included endophthalmitis, retinal detachment, and traumatic cataracts. Other serious ocular adverse events observed among ranibizumab-treated patients (incidence rate < 1%) included intraocular inflammation and blindness.

== Interactions ==
No significant interactions are known.

== Pharmacology ==
Ranibizumab is a monoclonal antibody that inhibits angiogenesis by inhibiting vascular endothelial growth factor A, a mechanism similar to that of bevacizumab.

== Society and culture ==
=== Legal status ===
In July 2026, the Committee for Medicinal Products for Human Use of the European Medicines Agency adopted a positive opinion, recommending the granting of a marketing authorization for the medicinal product Susvimo, intended for the treatment of neovascular (wet) age-related macular degeneration. The applicant for this medicinal product is Roche Registration. Medicines containing ranibizumab have been authorized in the European Union for the treatment of neovascular (wet) age-related macular degeneration since 2007; they are injected intravitreally (into the vitreous humor, the jelly-like fluid in the eye). Susvimo was authorized for medical use in the European Union in September 2026.

==== Biosimilars ====
Byooviz was authorized for medical use in the European Union in August 2021.

Ranibizumab-nuna (Byooviz) was approved for medical use in the United States in September 2021.

In India, Lupin Limited received marketing approval for its biosimilar of Ranibizumab.

In June 2022, the Committee for Medicinal Products for Human Use (CHMP) of the European Medicines Agency adopted a positive opinion, recommending the granting of a marketing authorization for the medicinal product Ranivisio, intended for the treatment of neovascular (wet) age-related macular degeneration, visual impairment due to macular edema or choroidal neovascularization, and proliferative diabetic retinopathy. The applicant for this medicinal product is Midas Pharma GmbH. Ranivisio was authorized for medical use in the European Union in August 2022.

Ranibizumab-eqrn (Cimerli) was approved for medical use in the United States in August 2022.

In September 2022, the CHMP adopted a positive opinion, recommending the granting of a marketing authorization for the medicinal product Ximluci, intended for the treatment of neovascular (wet) age-related macular degeneration, visual impairment due to diabetic macular edema, proliferative diabetic retinopathy, visual impairment due to macular edema secondary to retinal vein occlusion (branch RVO or central RVO), and visual impairment due to choroidal neovascularization. The applicant for this medicinal product is STADA Arzneimittel AG. Ximluci was authorized for medical use in the European Union in November 2022.

In November 2023, the CHMP adopted a positive opinion, recommending the granting of a marketing authorization for the medicinal product Rimmyrah, intended for the treatment of neovascular (wet) age-related macular degeneration, visual impairment due to diabetic macular edema, proliferative diabetic retinopathy, visual impairment due to macular edema secondary to retinal vein occlusion (branch RVO or central RVO), and visual impairment due to choroidal neovascularization. The applicant for this medicinal product is QILU PHARMA SPAIN S.L. Rimmyrah is a biosimilar medicinal product that is highly similar to the reference product Lucentis, which was authorized in the EU in January 2007. Rimmyrah was authorized for medical use in the European Union in January 2024.

In January 2024, Sandoz signed an agreement to acquire ranibizumab-eqrn, the biosimilar version of ranibizumab branded as Cimerli from Coherus BioSciences, Inc. for an upfront cash purchase payment of US$170 million.

In July 2024, the CHMP adopted a positive opinion, recommending the granting of a marketing authorization for the medicinal product Epruvy, intended for the treatment of neovascular (wet) age-related macular degeneration, visual impairment due to diabetic macular edema, proliferative diabetic retinopathy, visual impairment due to macular edema secondary to retinal vein occlusion and visual impairment due to choroidal neovascularization. The applicant for this medicinal product is Midas Pharma GmbH. Epruvy is a biosimilar medicinal product and is a duplicate of Ranivisio. Epruvy was authorized for medical use in the European Union in September 2024.

Ranibizumab-leyk (Nufymco) was approved for medical use in the United States in December 2025. It is indicated for the treatment of neovascular (wet) age-related macular degeneration; macular edema following retinal vein occlusion; diabetic macular edema; diabetic retinopathy; and myopic choroidal neovascularization.

In December 2025, the CHMP adopted a positive opinion, recommending the granting of a marketing authorization for the medicinal product Ranluspec, intended for the treatment of neovascular (wet) age-related macular degeneration, visual impairment due to diabetic macular edema, proliferative diabetic retinopathy, visual impairment due to macular edema secondary to retinal vein occlusion and visual impairment due to choroidal neovascularisation. The applicant for this medicinal product is Lupin Europe GmbH. Ranluspec is a biosimilar medicinal product that is highly similar to the reference product Lucentis. Ranluspec was authorized for medical use in the European Union in February 2026.

In April 2026, the CHMP adopted a positive opinion, recommending the granting of a marketing authorization for the medicinal product Rexatilux, intended for the treatment of neovascular (wet) age-related macular degeneration, visual impairment due to diabetic macular edema, proliferative diabetic retinopathy, visual impairment due to macular edema secondary to retinal vein occlusion and visual impairment due to choroidal neovascularization. The applicant for this medicinal product is Intas Third Party Sales 2005 S.L. Rexatilux is a biosimilar medicinal product that is highly similar to the reference product Lucentis. Rexatilux was authorized for medical use in the European Union in June 2026.

In May 2026, the CHMP adopted a positive opinion, recommending the granting of a marketing authorization for the medicinal product Vislyfa, intended for the treatment of neovascular (wet) age-related macular degeneration, visual impairment due to diabetic macular edema, proliferative diabetic retinopathy, visual impairment due to macular edema secondary to retinal vein occlusion and visual impairment due to choroidal neovascularization. The applicant for this medicinal product is Lupin Europe GmbH. Vislyfa is a biosimilar medicinal product that is highly similar to the reference product Lucentis. Vislyfa was authorized for medical use in the European Union in July 2026.

Ranibizumab-blrz (Lucamzi), a biosimilar to Lucentis, was approved for medical use in the United States in October 2026. It was developed by Xbrane Biopharma.

=== Economics ===
Its effectiveness is similar to that of bevacizumab. Its rates of side effects also appear similar. However, ranibizumab typically costs $2,000 a dose, while the equivalent dose of bevacizumab typically costs $50.

Genentech offered secret rebates to about 300 ophthalmologists in an apparent inducement to get them to use more ranibizumab rather than the less expensive bevacizumab. In 2008, bevacizumab cost Medicare only $20 million for about 480,000 injections, while ranibizumab cost Medicare $537 million for only 337,000 injections. A small study showed no superior effect of ranibizumab versus bevacizumab in direct comparison. The initial results of the larger Comparison of Age-related Macular Degeneration Treatments Trials (CATT) found that the two drugs "had equivalent effects on visual acuity when administered according to the same schedule;" however, serious adverse events were more common in the bevacizumab arm of the trial.

According to a 2012 meta-analysis, the results of several subsequent head-to-head trials found that the two therapies performed equally at restoring visual acuity. A 2012 meta-analysis focused specifically on safety issues concluded that the rates of several adverse events were higher with bevacizumab, although the absolute rates of ocular serious adverse events were low with both therapies: ocular adverse events were about 2.8 times as frequent with bevacizumab than with ranibizumab.
