= Aflibercept =

Pharmaceutical drug

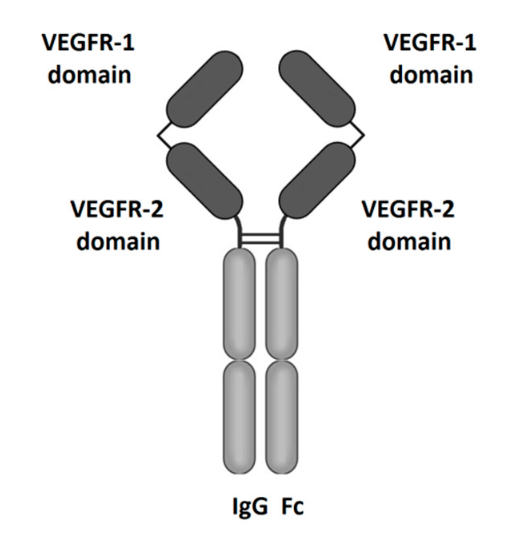

Clinical data
- Trade names: Eylea, Zaltrap
- Other names: ziv-aflibercept
- Biosimilars: aflibercept-abzv, aflibercept-ayyh, aflibercept-jbvf, aflibercept-mrbb, aflibercept-yszy, Ahzantive, Baiama, Enzeevu, Eydenzelt, Eyluxvi, Opuviz, Pavblu, Yesafili
- AHFS/Drugs.com: Aflibercept Monograph; Ziv-aflibercept Monograph
- MedlinePlus: a612004
- License data: US DailyMed: Aflibercept
- Pregnancy category: AU: D; Not recommended
- Routes of administration: Intravenous, intravitreal injection
- Drug class: Antineovascularization agent
- ATC code: L01XX44 (WHO) S01LA05 (WHO)

Legal status
- Legal status: AU: S4 (Prescription only); CA: ℞-only; UK: POM (Prescription only); US: ℞-only; EU: Rx-only; In general: ℞ (Prescription only)

Identifiers
- CAS Number: 862111-32-8
- DrugBank: DB08885
- ChemSpider: none
- UNII: 15C2VL427D
- KEGG: D09574
- ChEMBL: ChEMBL1742982

Chemical and physical data
- Formula: C_{4318}H_{6788}N_{1164}O_{1304}S_{32}
- Molar mass: 96898.57 g·mol^{−1}

Aflibercept, sold under the brand names Eylea and Zaltrap among others, is a medication used to treat wet macular degeneration and metastatic colorectal cancer. It was developed by Regeneron Pharmaceuticals.

It is an inhibitor of vascular endothelial growth factor (VEGF). Aflibercept is a recombinant fusion protein consisting of the extracellular domains of human VEGF receptor 1 and 2 fused to the Fc portion of human IgG1. By acting as a soluble decoy for the natural VEGF receptors, aflibercept inhibits their activation, thereby reducing angiogenesis.

== Medical uses ==
Aflibercept (Eylea) is indicated for the treatment of people with neovascular (wet) age-related macular degeneration, macular edema following retinal vein occlusion, diabetic macular edema, diabetic retinopathy, and retinopathy of prematurity.

Aflibercept (Zaltrap), in combination with fluorouracil, leucovorin, and irinotecan (known as FOLFIRI), is indicated for the treatment of people with metastatic colorectal cancer that is resistant to, or has progressed following, an oxaliplatin-containing regimen.

It is used for the treatment of wet macular degeneration and is administered as an intravitreal injection, that is, into the eye. For cancer treatment, it is given intravenously in combination with fluorouracil, leucovorin, and irinotecan.

In July 2014, aflibercept (Eylea) was approved for the treatment of people with visual impairment due to diabetic macular edema In May 2019, the US FDA expanded the indication for aflibercept to include all stages of diabetic retinopathy.

In February 2023, the US FDA approved aflibercept (Eylea) as a treatment for retinopathy of prematurity.

== Contraindications ==
Aflibercept (Eylea) is contraindicated in people with infections or active inflammations of or near the eye, while aflibercept (Zaltrap) has no contraindications.

== Adverse effects ==
Common adverse effects of the eye formulation include conjunctival hemorrhage, eye pain, cataract, vitreous detachment, floaters, and ocular hypertension.

Aflibercept (Zaltrap) has adverse effects typical of anti-cancer drugs, such as reduced blood cell count (leukopenia, neutropenia, thrombocytopenia), gastrointestinal disorders like diarrhea and abdominal pain, and fatigue. Another common effect is hypertension (increased blood pressure).

== Interactions ==
No interactions are described for either formulation.

== Mechanism of action ==
In wet macular degeneration, abnormal blood vessels grow in the choriocapillaris, a layer of capillaries in the eye, leading to blood and protein leakage below the macula.

Aflibercept (Zaltrap) binds to circulating VEGFs and acts like a "VEGF trap". It thereby inhibits the activity of the vascular endothelial growth factor subtypes VEGF-A and VEGF-B, as well as to placental growth factor (PGF), inhibiting the growth of new blood vessels in the choriocapillaris or the tumour, respectively.

== Composition ==
Aflibercept is a recombinant fusion protein consisting of vascular endothelial growth factor (VEGF)-binding portions from the extracellular domains of human VEGF receptors 1 and 2, that are fused to the Fc portion of the human IgG1 immunoglobulin.

== History ==
Regeneron commenced clinical testing of aflibercept in cancer in 2001. In 2003, Regeneron signed a major deal with Aventis to develop aflibercept in the field of cancer. In 2004 Regeneron started testing the compound, locally delivered, in proliferative eye diseases, and in 2006 Regeneron and Bayer signed an agreement to develop the eye indications.

== Society and culture ==
=== Legal status ===
In November 2011, the US Food and Drug Administration (FDA) approved aflibercept for the treatment of wet macular degeneration.

In August 2012, the US FDA approved aflibercept (Zaltrap) for use in combination with 5-fluorouracil, folinic acid and irinotecan to treat adults with metastatic colorectal cancer that is resistant to, or has progressed following, an oxaliplatin‑containing regimen. To avoid confusion with the version that is injected into the eye, the FDA assigned a new name, ziv-aflibercept, to the active ingredient.

In November 2012, the European Medicines Agency (EMA) authorized aflibercept (Eylea) for the treatment of wet macular degeneration.

In February 2013, the European Medicines Agency (EMA) authorized aflibercept (Zaltrap) for the treatment of adults with metastatic colorectal cancer for whom treatment based on oxaliplatin has not worked or the cancer got worse. Aflibercept (Zaltrap) is used with irinotecan, 5-fluorouracil, and folinic acid.

In August 2023, the FDA approved aflibercept (Eylea) for the treatment of wet age-related macular degeneration, diabetic macular edema, and diabetic retinopathy.

==== Biosimilars ====
Yesafili was authorized for medical use in the European Union in September 2023.

In May 2024, aflibercept-jbvf (Yesafili) and aflibercept-yszy (Opuviz) were approved for medical use in the United States.

Aflibercept-mrbb (Ahzantive) was approved for medical use in the US in June 2024. It is a biosimilar to Eylea.

In August 2024, aflibercept-abzv (Enzeevu) was approved for medical use in the US. It is a biosimilar to Eylea.

In August 2024, aflibercept-ayyh (Pavblu) was approved for medical use in the US. It is a biosimilar to Eylea.

In September 2024, the Committee for Medicinal Products for Human Use (CHMP) of the European Medicines Agency adopted a positive opinion, recommending the granting of a marketing authorization for the medicinal product Opuviz, intended for the treatment of neovascular (wet) age-related macular degeneration, visual impairment due to macular edema secondary to retinal vein occlusion, visual impairment due to diabetic macular edema and visual impairment due to myopic choroidal neovascularization. The applicant for this medicinal product is Samsung Bioepis NL B.V. Opuviz is a biosimilar medicinal product that is highly similar to the reference product Eylea, which was authorized in the EU in November 2012.

In September 2024, the CHMP adopted a positive opinion, recommending the granting of a marketing authorization for the medicinal product Afqlir, intended for the treatment of neovascular (wet) age-related macular degeneration, visual impairment due to macular edema secondary to retinal vein occlusion, visual impairment due to diabetic macular edema and visual impairment due to myopic choroidal neovascularization. The applicant for this medicinal product is Sandoz GmbH. Afqlir is a biosimilar medicinal product that is highly similar to the reference product Eylea. Afqlir was authorized for medical use in the EU in November 2024.

In November 2024, the CHMP adopted a positive opinion, recommending the granting of a marketing authorization for the medicinal product Ahzantive, intended for the treatment of neovascular (wet) age-related macular degeneration, visual impairment due to macular edema secondary to retinal vein occlusion, visual impairment due to diabetic macular edema and visual impairment due to myopic choroidal neovascularization. The applicant for this medicinal product is Klinge Biopharma GmbH. Ahzantive is a biosimilar medicinal product that is highly similar to the reference product Eylea. Ahzantive was authorized for medical use in the EU in January 2025.

In November 2024, the CHMP adopted a positive opinion, recommending the granting of a marketing authorization for the medicinal product Baiama, intended for the treatment of neovascular (wet) age-related macular degeneration, visual impairment due to macular edema secondary to retinal vein occlusion, visual impairment due to diabetic macular edema and visual impairment due to myopic choroidal neovascularization. The applicant for this medicinal product is Formycon AG. Baiama is a biosimilar medicinal product that is highly similar to the reference product Eylea. Baiama was authorized for medical use in the EU in January 2025.

In December 2024, the CHMP adopted a positive opinion, recommending the granting of a marketing authorization for the medicinal product Eydenzelt, intended for the treatment of neovascular (wet) age-related macular degeneration, visual impairment due to macular edema secondary to retinal vein occlusion, visual impairment due to diabetic macular edema and visual impairment due to myopic choroidal neovascularization. The applicant for this medicinal product is Celltrion Healthcare Hungary Kft. Eydenzelt is a biosimilar medicinal product that is highly similar to the reference product Eylea.

In January 2025, the CHMP adopted a positive opinion, recommending the granting of a marketing authorization for the medicinal product Pavblu, intended for the treatment of neovascular (wet) age-related macular degeneration, visual impairment due to macular edema secondary to retinal vein occlusion, visual impairment due to diabetic macular edema and visual impairment due to myopic choroidal neovascularization. The applicant for this medicinal product is Amgen Technology (Ireland) UC. Pavblu is a biosimilar medicinal product that is highly similar to the reference product Eylea. Pavblu was authorized for medical use in the EU in April 2025.

In January 2025, the CHMP adopted a positive opinion, recommending the granting of a marketing authorization for the medicinal product Skojoy, intended for the treatment of neovascular (wet) age-related macular degeneration, visual impairment due to macular edema secondary to retinal vein occlusion, and visual impairment due to myopic choroidal neovascularization. The applicant for this medicinal product is Amgen Technology (Ireland) UC. Skojoy is a biosimilar medicinal product that is highly similar to the reference product Eylea.

In June 2025, the CHMP adopted a positive opinion, recommending the granting of a marketing authorization for the medicinal product Afiveg, intended for the treatment of adults with neovascular (wet) age-related macular degeneration, visual impairment due to macular edema secondary to retinal vein occlusion, visual impairment due to diabetic macular edema and visual impairment due to myopic choroidal neovascularization. The applicant for this medicinal product is STADA Arzneimittel AG. Afiveg is a biosimilar medicinal product that is highly similar to the reference product Eylea. Afiveg was authorized for medical use in the EU in August 2025.

In June 2025, the CHMP adopted a positive opinion, recommending the granting of a marketing authorization for the medicinal product Eiyzey, intended for the treatment of neovascular (wet) age-related macular degeneration, visual impairment due to macular edema secondary to retinal vein occlusion, visual impairment due to diabetic macular edema and visual impairment due to myopic choroidal neovascularization. The applicant for this medicinal product is Zakłady Farmaceutyczne Polpharma S.A. Eiyzey is a biosimilar medicinal product that is highly similar to the reference product Eylea. Eiyzey was authorized for medical use in the EU in August 2025.

In June 2025, the CHMP adopted a positive opinion, recommending the granting of a marketing authorization for the medicinal product Mynzepli, intended for the treatment of adults with neovascular (wet) age-related macular degeneration, visual impairment due to macular edema secondary to retinal vein occlusion, visual impairment due to diabetic macular edema and visual impairment due to myopic choroidal neovascularization. The applicant for this medicinal product is Advanz Pharma Limited. Mynzepli is a biosimilar medicinal product that is highly similar to the reference product Eylea. Mynzepli was authorized for medical use in the EU in August 2025.

In June 2025, the CHMP adopted a positive opinion, recommending the granting of a marketing authorization for the medicinal product Vgenfli, intended for the treatment of neovascular (wet) age-related macular degeneration, visual impairment due to macular V secondary to retinal vein occlusion, visual impairment due to diabetic macular edema and visual impairment due to myopic choroidal neovascularization. The applicant for this medicinal product is Zakłady Farmaceutyczne Polpharma S.A. Vgenfli is a biosimilar medicinal product that is highly similar to the reference product Eylea. Vgenfli was authorized for medical use in the EU in August 2025.

In June 2025, Yesafili, a biosimilar of Eylea, was approved for medical use in Canada.

In July 2025, the CHMP adopted a positive opinion, recommending the granting of a marketing authorization for the medicinal product Eyluxvi, intended for the treatment of adults with neovascular (wet) age-related macular degeneration, visual impairment due to macular edema secondary to retinal vein occlusion, visual impairment due to diabetic macular edema and visual impairment due to myopic choroidal neovascularization. The applicant for this medicinal product is Biolitec Pharma Limited Zweigniederlassung Jena. Eyluxvi is a biosimilar medicinal product. It is highly similar to the reference product Eylea. Eyluxvi was authorized for medical use in the EU in September 2025.

In July 2025, Pavblu, a biosimilar of Eylea, was approved for medical use in Canada.

=== Economics ===
In March 2015, aflibercept was one of a group of drugs delisted from the UK Cancer Drugs Fund. In 2017, injections of aflibercept (HCPCS code J0178) were responsible for the most billing to Medicare Part B, at US$2.36 billion.

== Research ==
In March 2011, aflibercept failed its primary endpoint of overall survival in the Vital phase III trial for second-line treatment of locally advanced or metastatic non-small cell lung cancer, although it improved the secondary endpoint of progression-free survival.

In April 2011, aflibercept improved its primary endpoint of overall survival in the Velour phase III clinical trial for second-line treatment for metastatic colorectal cancer.

Aflibercept was also in a phase III trial for hormone-refractory metastatic prostate cancer as of April 2011.

A 2016 Cochrane Review examined outcomes comparing aflibercept versus ranibizumab injections in over 2400 people with neovascular AMD, from two randomized controlled trials. Both treatment options yielded similar improvements in visual acuity and morphological outcomes, though the authors note that the aflibercept treatment regimen has the potential to reduce treatment burden and risks from frequent injections.

A 2017 review update studying the effects of anti-VEGF drugs on diabetic macular edema found that while all three studied treatments have advantages over laser therapy, there was moderate evidence that aflibercept is significantly favored in all measured efficacy outcomes over ranibizumab and bevacizumab, after one year, longer term advantages were unclear.
