= Bevacizumab =

Medication

Monoclonal antibody
- Type: Whole antibody
- Source: Humanized (from mouse)
- Target: VEGF-A

Clinical data
- Pronunciation: /ˌbɛvəˈsɪzjʊmæb/
- Trade names: Avastin, others
- Other names: bevacizumab gamma
- Biosimilars: bevacizumab-adcd, bevacizumab-awwb, bevacizumab-bvzr, bevacizumab-maly, bevacizumab-nwgd, bevacizumab-tnjn, bevacizumab-vikg, Abevmy, Alymsys, Avzivi, Aybintio, Bambevi, Bevacip, Bevaciptin, Equidacent, Jobevne Lytenava, Mvasi, Onbevzi, Oyavas, Vegzelma, Zirabev
- AHFS/Drugs.com: Monograph
- MedlinePlus: a607001
- License data: US DailyMed: Bevacizumab
- Pregnancy category: AU: D
- Routes of administration: Intravenous, intravitreal
- ATC code: L01FG01 (WHO) S01LA08 (WHO)

Legal status
- Legal status: AU: S4 (Prescription only); CA: ℞-only / Schedule D; US: ℞-only; EU: Rx-only; In general: ℞ (Prescription only)

Pharmacokinetic data
- Bioavailability: 100% (IV only)
- Elimination half-life: 20 days (range: 11–50 days)

Identifiers
- CAS Number: 216974-75-3
- DrugBank: DB00112
- ChemSpider: none
- UNII: 2S9ZZM9Q9V
- KEGG: D06409
- ChEMBL: ChEMBL1201583

Chemical and physical data
- Formula: C_{6638}H_{10160}N_{1720}O_{2108}S_{44}
- Molar mass: 149198.87 g·mol^{−1}

Bevacizumab, sold under the brand name Avastin among others, is a monoclonal antibody medication used to treat a number of types of cancers and a specific eye disease. For cancer, it is given by slow injection into a vein (intravenous) and used for colon cancer, lung cancer, ovarian cancer, glioblastoma, hepatocellular carcinoma, and renal-cell carcinoma. In many of these diseases it is used as a first-line therapy. For age-related macular degeneration it is given by injection into the eye (intravitreal).

Common side effects when used for cancer include nose bleeds, headache, high blood pressure, and rash. Other severe side effects include gastrointestinal perforation, bleeding, allergic reactions, blood clots, and an increased risk of infection. Bevacizumab is a monoclonal antibody that functions as an angiogenesis inhibitor. It works by slowing the growth of new blood vessels by inhibiting vascular endothelial growth factor A (VEGF-A), in other words anti–VEGF therapy.

Bevacizumab was approved for medical use in the United States in 2004. It is on the World Health Organization's List of Essential Medicines.

== Medical uses ==
=== Colorectal cancer ===
Bevacizumab was approved in the United States in February 2004, for use in metastatic colorectal cancer when used with standard chemotherapy treatment (as first-line treatment). In June 2006, it was approved with 5-fluorouracil-based therapy for second-line metastatic colorectal cancer.

It was authorized by the European Union in January 2005, for use in colorectal cancer.

Bevacizumab has also been examined as an add on to other chemotherapy drugs in people with non-metastatic colon cancer. The data from two large randomized studies showed no benefit in preventing the cancer from returning and a potential to cause harm in this setting.

In the EU, bevacizumab in combination with fluoropyrimidine-based chemotherapy is indicated for treatment of adults with metastatic carcinoma of the colon or rectum.

=== Lung cancer ===
In 2006, the US Food and Drug Administration (FDA) approved bevacizumab for use in first-line advanced nonsquamous non-small cell lung cancer in combination with carboplatin/paclitaxel chemotherapy. The approval was based on the pivotal study E4599 (conducted by the Eastern Cooperative Oncology Group), which demonstrated a two-month improvement in overall survival in patients treated with bevacizumab (Sandler, et al. NEJM 2004). A preplanned analysis of histology in E4599 demonstrated a four-month median survival benefit with bevacizumab for people with adenocarcinoma (Sandler, et al. JTO 2010); adenocarcinoma represents approximately 85% of all non-squamous cell carcinomas of the lung.

A subsequent European clinical trial, AVAiL, was first reported in 2009 and confirmed the significant improvement in progression-free survival shown in E4599 (Reck, et al. Ann. Oncol. 2010). An overall survival benefit was not demonstrated in patients treated with bevacizumab; however, this may be due to the more limited use of bevacizumab as maintenance treatment in AVAiL versus E4599 (this differential effect is also apparent in the European vs US trials of bevacizumab in colorectal cancer: Tyagi and Grothey, Clin Colorectal Cancer, 2006). As an anti-angiogenic agent, there is no mechanistic rationale for stopping bevacizumab before disease progression. Stated another way, the survival benefits achieved with bevacizumab can only be expected when used in accordance with the clinical evidence: continued until disease progression or treatment-limiting side effects.

Another large European-based clinical trial with bevacizumab in lung cancer, AVAPERL, was reported in October 2011 (Barlesi, et al. ECCM 2011). First-line patients were treated with bevacizumab plus cisplatin/pemetrexed for four cycles, and then randomized to receive maintenance treatment with either bevacizumab/pemetrexed or bevacizumab alone until disease progression. Maintenance treatment with bevacizumab/pemetrexed demonstrated a 50% reduction in risk of progression vs bevacizumab alone (median PFS: 10.2 vs 6.6 months). Maintenance treatment with bevacizumab/pemetrexed did not confer a significant increase in overall survival vs bevacizumab alone on follow up analysis.

In the EU, bevacizumab, in addition to platinum-based chemotherapy, is indicated for first-line treatment of adults with unresectable advanced, metastatic or recurrent non-small cell lung cancer other than predominantly squamous cell histology. Bevacizumab, in combination with erlotinib, is indicated for first-line treatment of adults with unresectable advanced, metastatic or recurrent non-squamous non-small cell lung cancer with Epidermal Growth Factor Receptor (EGFR) activating mutations.

=== Breast cancer ===
In December 2010, the US Food and Drug Administration (FDA) notified its intention to remove the breast cancer indication from bevacizumab, saying that it had not been shown to be safe and effective in breast cancer patients. The combined data from four different clinical trials showed that bevacizumab neither prolonged overall survival nor slowed disease progression sufficiently to outweigh the risk it presents to patients. This only prevented Genentech from marketing bevacizumab for breast cancer. Doctors are free to prescribe bevacizumab off label, although insurance companies are less likely to approve off-label treatments. In June 2011, an FDA panel unanimously rejected an appeal by Roche. A panel of cancer experts ruled for a second time that Avastin should no longer be used in breast cancer patients, clearing the way for the US government to remove its endorsement from the drug. The June 2011 meeting of the FDA's oncologic drug advisory committee was the last step in an appeal by the drug's maker. The committee concluded that breast cancer clinical studies of patients taking Avastin have shown no advantage in survival rates, no improvement in quality of life, and significant side effects.

In the EU, bevacizumab in combination with paclitaxel is indicated for first-line treatment of adults with metastatic breast cancer. Bevacizumab in combination with capecitabine is indicated for first-line treatment of adults with metastatic breast cancer in whom treatment with other chemotherapy options including taxanes or anthracyclines is not considered appropriate.

=== Kidney cancer ===
In certain kidney cancers, bevacizumab improves the progression free survival time but not survival time. In 2009, the US Food and Drug Administration (FDA) approved bevacizumab for use in metastatic renal cell cancer (a form of kidney cancer). Following earlier reports of activity, European Union (EU) approval was granted in 2007.

In the EU, bevacizumab in combination with interferon alfa-2a is indicated for first-line treatment of adults with advanced and/or metastatic renal cell cancer.

=== Brain cancers ===
Bevacizumab slows tumor growth but does not affect overall survival in people with glioblastoma. The FDA granted accelerated approval for the treatment of recurrent glioblastoma multiforme in May 2009. A 2018 Cochrane review deemed there to not be good evidence for its use in recurrences either.

=== Ovarian cancer ===
In 2018, the US Food and Drug Administration (FDA) approved bevacizumab in combination with chemotherapy for stage III or IV of ovarian cancer after initial surgical operation, followed by single-agent bevacizumab. The approval was based on a study of the addition of bevacizumab to carboplatin and paclitaxel. Progression-free survival was increased to 18 months from 13 months.

In the EU, bevacizumab, in combination with carboplatin and paclitaxel is indicated for the front-line treatment of adults with advanced (International Federation of Gynecology and Obstetrics (FIGO) stages IIIB, IIIC and IV) epithelial ovarian, fallopian tube, or primary peritoneal cancer. Bevacizumab, in combination with carboplatin and gemcitabine or in combination with carboplatin and paclitaxel, is indicated for treatment of adults with first recurrence of platinum-sensitive epithelial ovarian, fallopian tube or primary peritoneal cancer who have not received prior therapy with bevacizumab or other VEGF inhibitors or VEGF receptor-targeted agents.

In May 2020, the FDA expanded the indication of olaparib to include its combination with bevacizumab for first-line maintenance treatment of adults with advanced epithelial ovarian, fallopian tube, or primary peritoneal cancer who are in complete or partial response to first-line platinum-based chemotherapy and whose cancer is associated with homologous recombination deficiency positive status defined by either a deleterious or suspected deleterious BRCA mutation, and/or genomic instability.

=== Cervical cancer ===
In the EU, bevacizumab, in combination with paclitaxel and cisplatin or, alternatively, paclitaxel and topotecan in people who cannot receive platinum therapy, is indicated for the treatment of adults with persistent, recurrent, or metastatic carcinoma of the cervix.

=== Macular degeneration ===
In the EU, bevacizumab gamma (Lytenava) is indicated for the treatment of neovascular (wet) age-related macular degeneration (nAMD). In the US, the drug was also approved by the FDA in 2026.

== Adverse effects ==
Bevacizumab inhibits the growth of blood vessels, which is part of the body's normal healing and maintenance. The body grows new blood vessels in wound healing, and as collateral circulation around blocked or atherosclerotic blood vessels. One concern is that bevacizumab will interfere with these normal processes, and worsen conditions like coronary artery disease or peripheral artery disease.

The main side effects are hypertension and heightened risk of bleeding. Bowel perforation has been reported. Fatigue and infection are also common.

In advanced lung cancer, less than half of patients qualify for treatment. Nasal septum perforation and renal thrombotic microangiopathy have been reported. In December 2010, the FDA warned of the risk of developing perforations in the body, including in the nose, stomach, and intestines.

In 2013, Hoffmann-La Roche announced that the drug was associated with 52 cases of necrotizing fasciitis from 1997 to 2012, of which 17 patients died. About 2/3 of cases involved patients with colorectal cancer, or patients with gastrointestinal perforations or fistulas.

These effects are largely avoided in ophthalmological use since the drug is introduced directly into the eye thus minimizing any effects on the rest of the body.

Neurological adverse events include reversible posterior encephalopathy syndrome, occasionally complicated by seizure or nonconvulsive status epilepticus. Ischemic and hemorrhagic strokes are also possible.

Protein in the urine occurs in approximately 20% of people. This does not require permanent discontinuation of the drug. Nonetheless, the presence of nephrotic syndrome necessitates permanent discontinuation of bevacizumab.

== Mechanism of action ==
Bevacizumab is a recombinant, humanized monoclonal antibody that functions as an angiogenesis inhibitor (inhibiting vascular endothelial growth factor A, VEGF-A). Its primary action is to inhibit the formation of new blood vessels (a process known as angiogenesis) which is essential for the progression of various types of cancer and thus considered a central target of modern cancer therapy.

Like healthy cells, cancer cells depend on a supply of oxygen and nutrients to survive. While small tumors (up to 1–2 mm) can sustain themselves only via diffusion, larger tumors require their own blood supply. To achieve this, tumors undergo an "angiogenic switch," releasing growth factors that stimulate the formation of blood vessels toward the tumor (tumor angiogenesis). The most critical mediator in this process is Vascular Endothelial Growth Factor (VEGF), particularly VEGF-A.

Bevacizumab is an angiogenesis inhibitor that binds specifically to the growth factor VEGF. This prevents growth factor VEGF from binding to its receptors and thereby suppressing growth signaling. This targeted blockade of VEGF leads to the regression of newly formed, still immature blood vessels and prevents the formation of new vessels. As a result, the supply of oxygen and nutrients to the tumor is reduced, inhibiting its growth. In addition, therapy with the antibody normalizes vascular permeability.

VEGF-A is a growth factor protein that stimulates angiogenesis in a variety of diseases, especially in cancer. By binding VEGF-A, bevacizumab should act outside the cell, but in some cases (cervical and breast cancer) it is taken up by cells through constitutive endocytosis. Moreover, its use extends beyond oncology; in ophthalmology, it is administered via intravitreal injection, where it is taken up by retinal photoreceptor cells to treat conditions associated with pathological neovascularization in the eye after intravitreal injection.

== Chemistry ==
Bevacizumab was originally derived from a mouse monoclonal antibody generated from mice immunized with the 165-residue form of recombinant human vascular endothelial growth factor. It was humanized by retaining the binding region and replacing the rest with a human full light chain and a human truncated IgG1 heavy chain, with some other substitutions. The resulting plasmid was transfected into Chinese hamster ovary cells which are grown in industrial fermentation systems.

== History ==
Bevacizumab is a recombinant humanized monoclonal antibody and in 2004, it became the first clinically used angiogenesis inhibitor. Its development was based on the discovery of human vascular endothelial growth factor (VEGF), a protein that stimulated blood vessel growth, in the laboratory of Genentech scientist Napoleone Ferrara. Ferrara later demonstrated that antibodies against VEGF inhibit tumor growth in mice. His work validated the hypothesis of Judah Folkman, proposed in 1971, that stopping angiogenesis might be useful in controlling cancer growth.

=== Approval ===
It received its first approval in the United States in 2004, for combination use with standard chemotherapy for metastatic colon cancer.

In 2008, bevacizumab was approved for breast cancer by the FDA, but the approval was revoked on 18 November 2011 because, although there was evidence that it slowed progression of metastatic breast cancer, there was no evidence that it extended life or improved quality of life, and it caused adverse effects including severe high blood pressure and hemorrhaging.

In 2008, the FDA gave bevacizumab provisional approval for metastatic breast cancer, subject to further studies. The FDA's advisory panel had recommended against approval. In July 2010, after new studies failed to show a significant benefit, the FDA's advisory panel recommended against the indication for advanced breast cancer. Genentech requested a hearing, which was granted in June 2011. The FDA ruled to withdraw the breast cancer indication in November 2011. FDA approval is required for Genentech to market a drug for that indication. Doctors may sometimes prescribe it for that indication, although insurance companies are less likely to pay for it.

The drug remains approved for breast cancer use in other countries, including Australia. It has been funded by the English National Health Service (NHS) Cancer Drugs Fund, but in January 2015, it was proposed to remove it from the approved list. It remains on the Cancer Drugs Fund as of March 2023.

== Society and culture ==
=== Use for macular degeneration ===
In 2015, there was a fierce debate in the UK and other European countries concerning the choice of prescribing bevacizumab or ranibizumab (Lucentis) for wet AMD. In the UK, part of the tension was between on the one hand, both the European Union and the Medicines and Healthcare products Regulatory Agency which had approved Lucentis but not Avastin for wet AMD, and their interest in ensuring that doctors do not use medicines off-label when there are other, approved medications for the same indication, and on the other hand, NICE in the UK, which sets treatment guidelines, and has been unable so far to appraise Avastin as a first-line treatment, in order to save money for the National Health Service. Novartis and Roche (which respectively have marketing rights and ownership rights for Avastin) had not conducted clinical trials to get approval for Avastin for wet AMD and had no intention of doing so. Further, both companies lobbied against treatment guidelines that would make Avastin a first-line treatment, and when government-funded studies comparing the two drugs were published, they published papers emphasizing the risks of using Avastin for wet AMD.

In March 2024, the Committee for Medicinal Products for Human Use (CHMP) of the European Medicines Agency adopted a positive opinion, recommending the granting of a marketing authorization for the medicinal product Lytenava (bevacizumab gamma), intended for treatment of neovascular (wet) age-related macular degeneration (nAMD). The applicant for this medicinal product is Outlook Therapeutics Limited. Lytenava was authorized for medical use in the European Union in May 2024.

=== Breast cancer approval ===
In March 2007, the European Commission authorized bevacizumab in combination with paclitaxel for the first-line treatment of metastatic breast cancer.

In 2008, the US Food and Drug Administration (FDA) approved bevacizumab for use in breast cancer. A panel of outside advisers voted 5 to 4 against approval, but their recommendations were overruled. The panel expressed concern that data from the clinical trial did not show any increase in quality of life or prolonging of life for patients—two important benchmarks for late-stage cancer treatments. The clinical trial did show that bevacizumab reduced tumor volumes and showed an increase in progression free survival time. It was based on this data that the FDA chose to overrule the recommendation of the panel of advisers. This decision was lauded by patient advocacy groups and some oncologists. Other oncologists felt that granting approval for late-stage cancer therapies that did not prolong or increase the quality of life for patients would give license to pharmaceutical companies to ignore these important benchmarks when developing new late-stage cancer therapies.

=== Counterfeit ===
In February 2012, Roche and its US biotech unit Genentech announced that counterfeit Avastin had been distributed in the United States. The investigation is ongoing, but differences in the outer packaging make identification of the bogus drugs simple for medical providers. Roche analyzed three bogus vials of Avastin and found they contained salt, starch, citrate, isopropanol, propanediol, t-butanol, benzoic acid, di-fluorinated benzene ring, acetone and phthalate moiety, but no active ingredients of the cancer drug. According to Roche, the levels of the chemicals were not consistent; whether the chemicals were at harmful concentrations could not therefore be determined. The counterfeit Avastin has been traced back to Egypt, and it entered legitimate supply chains via Europe to the United States.

=== Biosimilars ===
In July 2014, two pharming companies, PlantForm and PharmaPraxis, announced plans to commercialize a biosimilar version of bevacizumab made using a tobacco expression system in collaboration with the Fraunhofer Center for Molecular Biology.

In September 2017, the US FDA approved Amgen's biosimilar (generic name bevacizumab-awwb, product name Mvasi) for six cancer indications.

In January 2018, Mvasi was authorized for use in the European Union.

In February 2019, Zirabev was authorized for use in the European Union. Zirabev was approved for medical use in the United States in June 2019, and in Australia in November 2019.

In June 2020, Mvasi was authorized for medical use in Australia.

In August 2020, Aybintio was authorized for use in the European Union.

In September 2020, Equidacent was authorized for use in the European Union.

In January 2021, the Committee for Medicinal Products for Human Use (CHMP) of the European Medicines Agency (EMA) adopted a positive opinion, recommending the granting of a marketing authorization for the medicinal product Alymsys, intended for the treatment of carcinoma of the colon or rectum, breast cancer, non-small cell lung cancer, renal cell cancer, epithelial ovarian, fallopian tube or primary peritoneal cancer, and carcinoma of the cervix. Alymsys was authorized for medical use in the European Union in March 2021.

In January 2021, Onbevzi was authorized for medical use in the European Union.

In June 2019, and June 2021, Zirabev was authorized for medical use in Canada.

Oyavas was authorized for medical use in the European Union in March 2021.

Abevmy was authorized for medical use in the European Union in April 2021, and in Australia in September 2021.

In September 2021, Bambevi was authorized for medical use in Canada.

Bevacip and Bevaciptin were authorized for medical use in Australia in November 2021.

In November 2021, Abevmy and Aybintio were authorized for medical use in Canada.

In April 2022, bevacizumab-maly (Alymsys) was approved for medical use in the United States.

In August 2022, Vegzelma was authorized for medical use in the European Union.

In September 2022, bevacizumab-adcd (Vegzelma) was approved for medical use in the United States.

In June 2023, Enzene Biosciences launched its bevacizumab biosimilar in India.

Bevacizumab-tnjn (Avzivi) was approved for medical use in the United States in December 2023.

In May 2024, the CHMP adopted a positive opinion, recommending the granting of a marketing authorization for the medicinal product Avzivi, intended for the treatment of carcinoma of the colon or rectum, breast cancer, non-small cell lung cancer, renal cell cancer, epithelial ovarian, fallopian tube or primary peritoneal cancer and carcinoma of the cervix. The applicant for this medicinal product is FGK Representative Service GmbH. Avzivi was authorized for medical use in the European Union in July 2024.

In April 2025, bevacizumab-nwgd (Jobevne) was approved for medical use in the United States.

In January 2026, the U.S. Food and Drug Administration (FDA) accepted the review of the Biologics License Application (BLA) submitted by Henlius for HLX04, its proposed bevacizumab biosimilar

== Research ==
A study released in April 2009, found that bevacizumab is not effective at preventing recurrences of non-metastatic colon cancer following surgery.

Bevacizumab has been tested in ovarian cancer where it has shown improvement in progression-free survival but not in overall survival. and glioblastoma multiforme where it failed to improve overall survival.

Bevacizumab has been investigated as a possible treatment of pancreatic cancer, as an addition to chemotherapy, but studies have shown no improvement in survival. It may also cause higher rates of high blood pressure, bleeding in the stomach and intestine, and intestinal perforations.

The drug has also undergone trials as an addition to established chemotherapy protocols and surgery in the treatment of pediatric osteosarcoma, and other sarcomas, such as leiomyosarcoma.

Bevacizumab has been studied as a treatment for cancers that grow from the nerve connecting the ear and the brain.
