= Vascular endothelial growth factor A =

Protein involved in blood vessel growth

VEGFA
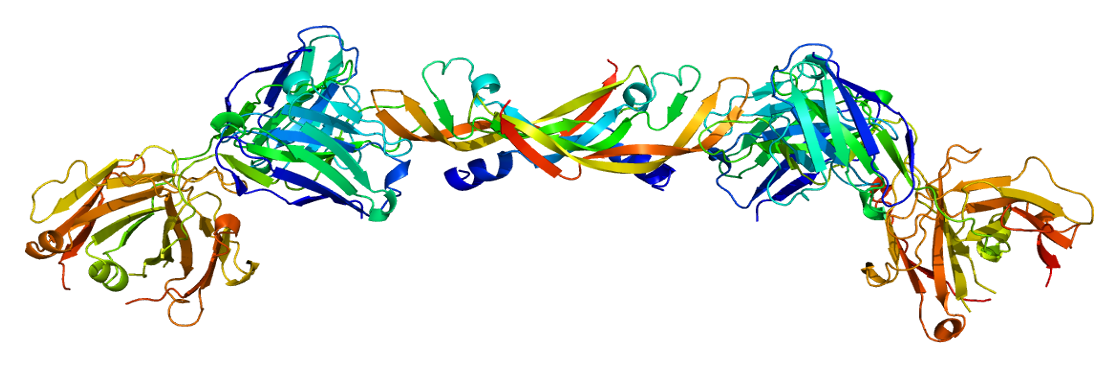

Identifiers
- Aliases: VEGFA, MVCD1, VEGF, VPF, vascular endothelial growth factor A
- External IDs: OMIM: 192240; MGI: 103178; GeneCards: VEGFA
Available structures
PDB	Ortholog search: H0YBI8 PDBe H0YBI8 RCSB
PDB	List of PDB id codes 1BJ1, 1CZ8, 1FLT, 1KAT, 1KMX, 1MJV, 1MKG, 1MKK, 1QTY, 1TZH, 1TZI, 1VGH, 1VPF, 1VPP, 2FJG, 2FJH, 2QR0, 2VGH, 2VPF, 3BDY, 3P9W, 3QTK, 3S1B, 3S1K, 3V2A, 4DEQ, 4GLN, 4GLS, 4KZN, 4QAF, 4WPB, 4ZFF, 5HHC, 5FV1, 5FV2, 5HHD, 5DN2

Gene location (Human)
Chr.	Chromosome 6 (human)
Band	6p21.1	Start	43,770,184 bp
Band	6p21.1	End	43,786,487 bp

Gene location (Mouse)
Chr.	Chromosome 17 (mouse)
Band	17 C|17 22.79 cM	Start	46,327,919 bp
Band	17 C|17 22.79 cM	End	46,343,295 bp
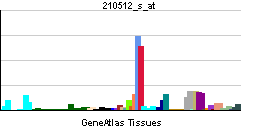

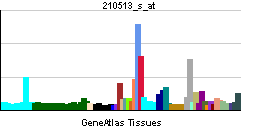

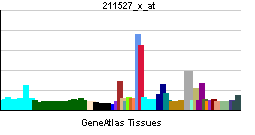
RNA expression pattern
Bgee	Human / Mouse (ortholog); Top expressed in: right lobe of thyroid gland; left lobe of thyroid gland; glomerulus; metanephric glomerulus; retinal pigment epithelium; cartilage tissue; right lobe of liver; apex of heart; pericardium; right auricle of heart / Top expressed in: neural layer of retina; muscle of thigh; left lung lobe; gastrula; right lung; submandibular gland; islet of Langerhans; brown adipose tissue; right lung lobe; adrenal gland; More reference expression data
BioGPS	More reference expression data
Gene ontology
Molecular function	heparin binding; extracellular matrix binding; cytokine activity; growth factor activity; neuropilin binding; vascular endothelial growth factor receptor 2 binding; receptor ligand activity; vascular endothelial growth factor receptor 1 binding; protein homodimerization activity; platelet-derived growth factor receptor binding; protein binding; vascular endothelial growth factor receptor binding; fibronectin binding; chemoattractant activity; identical protein binding; protein heterodimerization activity
Cellular component	cytoplasm; membrane; extracellular region; cell surface; secretory granule; platelet alpha granule lumen; extracellular space; extracellular matrix
Biological process	cardiac vascular smooth muscle cell development; positive regulation of protein phosphorylation; positive regulation of MAP kinase activity; vascular endothelial growth factor signaling pathway; positive regulation of receptor internalization; outflow tract morphogenesis; mammary gland alveolus development; monocyte differentiation; cell migration involved in sprouting angiogenesis; vasculogenesis; positive regulation of retinal ganglion cell axon guidance; vascular endothelial growth factor receptor signaling pathway; positive regulation of vascular permeability; positive regulation of mesenchymal cell proliferation; angiogenesis; positive regulation of blood vessel endothelial cell migration; positive regulation of ERK1 and ERK2 cascade; mesoderm development; positive regulation of positive chemotaxis; positive regulation of p38MAPK cascade; positive regulation of neuroblast proliferation; dopaminergic neuron differentiation; positive regulation of branching involved in ureteric bud morphogenesis; kidney development; lung development; coronary artery morphogenesis; in utero embryonic development; cell maturation; commissural neuron axon guidance; positive regulation of peptidyl-serine phosphorylation; positive regulation of CREB transcription factor activity; basophil chemotaxis; artery morphogenesis; regulation of transcription from RNA polymerase II promoter in response to hypoxia; positive regulation of peptidyl-tyrosine autophosphorylation; positive regulation of peptidyl-tyrosine phosphorylation; branching involved in blood vessel morphogenesis; positive regulation of protein localization to early endosome; primitive erythrocyte differentiation; positive regulation of protein kinase D signaling; lactation; cell differentiation; epithelial cell differentiation; positive regulation of leukocyte migration; positive regulation of epithelial cell proliferation; negative regulation of apoptotic process; negative regulation of transcription by RNA polymerase II; nervous system development; macrophage differentiation; positive regulation of angiogenesis; regulation of retinal ganglion cell axon guidance; lymph vessel morphogenesis; post-embryonic camera-type eye development; regulation of cell shape; ovarian follicle development; branching morphogenesis of an epithelial tube; coronary vein morphogenesis; surfactant homeostasis; positive regulation of vascular endothelial growth factor receptor signaling pathway; negative regulation of cysteine-type endopeptidase activity involved in apoptotic process; response to hypoxia; positive regulation of endothelial cell proliferation; positive regulation of protein-containing complex assembly; positive regulation of protein kinase C signaling; positive regulation of cell migration; heart morphogenesis; platelet degranulation; positive regulation of axon extension involved in axon guidance; positive regulation of endothelial cell migration; multicellular organism development; positive regulation of histone deacetylase activity; tube formation; positive regulation of gene expression; positive regulation of protein autophosphorylation; endothelial cell chemotaxis; positive regulation of cell proliferation by VEGF-activated platelet derived growth factor receptor signaling pathway; positive regulation of endothelial cell chemotaxis by VEGF-activated vascular endothelial growth factor receptor signaling pathway; eye photoreceptor cell development; positive regulation of transcription from RNA polymerase II promoter in response to hypoxia; positive regulation of focal adhesion assembly; cellular response to vascular endothelial growth factor stimulus; activation of protein kinase activity; positive regulation of cell division; camera-type eye morphogenesis; positive regulation of transcription by RNA polymerase II; positive regulation of cell adhesion; cellular response to hypoxia; positive chemotaxis; regulation of transcription by RNA polymerase II; positive regulation of cell population proliferation; induction of positive chemotaxis; positive regulation of mast cell chemotaxis; motor neuron migration; positive regulation of tyrosine phosphorylation of STAT protein; growth; VEGF-activated neuropilin signaling pathway; positive regulation of phosphorylation; regulation of signaling receptor activity; negative regulation of gene expression; cytokine-mediated signaling pathway; positive regulation of cell migration involved in sprouting angiogenesis; cellular stress response to acid chemical; positive regulation of blood vessel endothelial cell proliferation involved in sprouting angiogenesis; positive regulation of sprouting angiogenesis; positive regulation of DNA biosynthetic process; sprouting angiogenesis; regulation of nitric oxide mediated signal transduction; positive regulation of cold-induced thermogenesis; signal transduction
Sources:Amigo / QuickGO
Orthologs
Databases	NCBI: entry; OMA: entry
Species	Human	Mouse
Entrez	7422	22339
Ensembl	ENSG00000112715	ENSMUSG00000023951
UniProt	P15692	Q00731
RefSeq (mRNA)	NM_003376; NM_001025366; NM_001025367; NM_001025368; NM_001025369 NM_001025370; NM_001033756; NM_001171622; NM_001171623; NM_001171624; NM_001171625; NM_001171626; NM_001171627; NM_001171628; NM_001171629; NM_001171630; NM_001204384; NM_001204385; NM_001287044; NM_001317010	NM_001025250; NM_001025257; NM_001110266; NM_001110267; NM_001110268 NM_001287056; NM_001287057; NM_001287058; NM_009505; NM_001317041
RefSeq (protein)	NP_001020537; NP_001020538; NP_001020539; NP_001020540; NP_001020541 NP_001028928; NP_001165093; NP_001165094; NP_001165095; NP_001165096; NP_001165097; NP_001165098; NP_001165099; NP_001165100; NP_001165101; NP_001191313; NP_001191314; NP_001273973; NP_001303939; NP_003367	NP_001020421; NP_001020428; NP_001103736; NP_001103737; NP_001103738 NP_001273985; NP_001273986; NP_001273987; NP_001303970; NP_033531
Location (UCSC)	Chr 6: 43.77 – 43.79 Mb	Chr 17: 46.33 – 46.34 Mb
PubMed search
- Wikidata
View/Edit Human	View/Edit Mouse

Vascular endothelial growth factor A (VEGF-A) is a protein that in humans is encoded by the VEGFA gene. The chemical formula is C_{3914}H_{6252}N_{1212}O_{1278}S_{52}.

== Function ==
This gene is a member of the platelet-derived growth factor (PDGF)/vascular endothelial growth factor (VEGF) family and encodes a protein that is often found as a disulfide linked homodimer. This protein is a glycosylated mitogen that specifically acts on endothelial cells and has various effects, including mediating increased vascular permeability, inducing angiogenesis, vasculogenesis, and endothelial cell growth, promoting cell migration, and inhibiting apoptosis. Alternatively spliced transcript variants, encoding either freely secreted or cell-associated isoforms, have been characterized.

VEGF-A shows prominent activity with vascular endothelial cells, primarily through its interactions with the VEGFR1 and -R2 receptors found prominently on the endothelial cell membrane. However, it does have effects on a number of other cell types (e.g., stimulation monocyte/macrophage migration, neurons, cancer cells, kidney and epithelial cells ). In vitro, VEGF-A has been shown to stimulate endothelial cell mitogenesis and cell migration. VEGF-A is also a vasodilator and increases microvascular permeability and was originally referred to as vascular permeability factor.

During embryonic development angiogenesis is initiated as mesoderm mesenchyme cells are specified to differentiate into angioblasts, expressing the Vascular Endothelial Growth Factor Receptor (VEGFR-2). As embryonic tissue utilizes more oxygen than it receives from diffusion, it becomes hypoxic. These cells will secrete the signaling molecule vascular endothelial factor A (VEGFA) which will recruit the angioblasts expressing its partnering receptor to the site of future angiogenesis. The angioblasts will create scaffolding structures that form the primary capillary plexus from where the local vasculature system will develop. Disruption of this gene in mice resulted in abnormal embryonic blood vessel formation, resulting in underdeveloped vascular structures. This gene is also upregulated in many tumors and its expression is correlated with tumor development and is a target in many developing cancer therapeutics. Elevated levels of this protein are found in patients with POEMS syndrome, also known as Crow-Fukase syndrome which is a hemangioblastic proliferative disorder. Allelic variants of this gene have been associated with microvascular complications of diabetes 1 and atherosclerosis.

== Overview ==
Vascular endothelial growth factor A (VEGF-A) is a dimeric glycoprotein that plays a significant role in neurons and is considered to be the dominant inducer of the growth of blood vessels. VEGFA is essential for adults during organ remodeling and diseases that involve blood vessels, for example, in wound healing, tumor angiogenesis, diabetic retinopathy, and age-related macular degeneration. During early vertebrate development, vasculogenesis occurs which means that the endothelial condense into the blood vessels. The differentiation of endothelial cells is dependent upon the expression of VEGFA and if the expression is abolished then it can result in the death of the embryo. VEGFA is produced by a group of three major isoforms as a result of alternative splicing and if any three isoforms are produced (VEGFA120, VEGFA164, and VEGFA188) then this will not result in vessel defects and death of the full VEGFA knockout in mice. VEGFA is essential in the role of neurons because they too need vascular supply and abolishing the expression of VEGFA from neural progenitors will result in defects of the brain vascularization and neuronal apoptosis. Anti-VEGFA therapy can be used to treat patients with undesirable angiogenesis and vascular leakage in cancer and eye diseases but also could result in the inhibition of neurogenesis and neuroprotection. VEGFA could be used to treat patients with neurodegenerative and neuropathic conditions and also increase vascular permeability which will stop the blood-brain barrier and increase inflammatory cell infiltration.

== Usage ==
- Angiogenesis
  - ↑ Migration of endothelial cells
  - ↑ mitosis of endothelial cells
  - ↑ Matrix metalloproteinase activity
  - ↑ αvβ3 activity
  - creation of blood vessel lumen
  - creates lumen
  - creates fenestrations
- Chemotactic for macrophages and granulocytes
- Vasodilation (indirectly by NO release)

Also tumour suppression.

== Clinical significance ==
Elevated levels of this protein is linked to POEMS syndrome, also known as Crow-Fukase syndrome. Mutations in this gene have been associated with proliferative and nonproliferative diabetic retinopathy.

=== Treatment of ischemic heart disease ===
In ischemic cardiomyopathy, blood flow to the muscle cells of the heart is either partially or completely reduced, leading to cell death and scar tissue formation. Because the muscle cells are replaced with fibrous tissue, the heart loses its ability to contract, compromising heart function. Normally, if blood flow to the heart is compromised, over time, new blood vessels will develop, providing alternative circulation to the affected cells. The viability of the heart following severely restricted blood flow is dependent on the ability of the heart to provide this collateral circulation. Expression of VEGF-A has been found to be induced by myocardial ischemia and a higher level of expression of VEGF-A has been associated with better collateral circulation development during ischemia.

=== VEGF-A activation ===
When cells are deprived of oxygen, they increase their production of VEGF-A. VEGF-A mediates the growth of new blood vessels from pre-existing vessels (angiogenesis) by binding to the cell surface receptors VEGFR1 and VEGFR2, two tyrosine kinases located in endothelial cells of the cardiovascular system. These two receptors act through different pathways to contribute to endothelial cell proliferation and migration, and formation of tubular structures.

=== VEGFR2 ===
The binding of VEGF-A to VEGFR2 causes two VEGFR2 molecules to combine to form a dimer. Following this dimerization, through the action of the receptor itself, a phosphate group is added to certain tyrosines within the molecule in a process called auto-phosphorylation. The autophosphorylation of these amino acids allows for signalling molecules within to the cell to bind to the receptor and become activated. These signalling molecules include VEGF-receptor activated protein (VRAP), PLC- γ and Nck.

Each of these is important in the signalling required for angiogenesis. VRAP (also known as T-cell specific adaptor) and Nck signalling are important in reorganization of the structural components of the cell, allowing for cells to move around to areas where they are needed. PLC- γ is vital to the proliferative effects of VEGF-A signalling. Activation of the phospholipase PLC- γ results in an increase in calcium levels in the cell, leading to the activation of protein kinase C (PKC). PKC phosphorylates the mitogen-activated protein kinase (MAPK) ERK which then moves to the nucleus of the cell and takes part in nuclear signalling. Once in the nucleus, ERK activates various transcription factors which initiate expression of genes involved in cellular proliferation. Activation of a different MAPK (p38 MAPK) by VEGFR2 is important in the transcription of genes associated with cellular migration.

=== VEGFR1 ===
The tyrosine kinase activity of VEGFR1 is less efficient than that of VEGFR2 and its activation alone is insufficient to bring about the proliferative effects of VEGF-A. The major role of VEGFR1 is to recruit the cells responsible in blood cell development.

=== Current research ===
It has been shown that injection of VEGF-A in dogs following severely restricted blood flow to the heart caused an increase in collateral blood vessel formation compared to the dogs who did not receive the VEGF-A treatment. It was also shown in dogs that delivery of VEGF-A to areas of the heart with little or no blood flow enhanced collateral blood vessel formation and increased the viability of the cells in that area. In gene therapy, DNA which encodes the gene of interest is integrated into a vector along with elements that are able to promote the gene's expression. The vector is then injected either into muscle cells of the heart or the blood vessels supplying the heart. The natural machinery of the cell is then used to express these genes. Currently, human clinical trials are being conducted to study the effectiveness of gene therapy with VEGF-A in restoring blood flow and function to areas of the heart that have severely restricted blood flow. So far, this type of therapy has proven both safe and beneficial.

== Interactions ==
Vascular endothelial growth factor A has been shown to interact with:

- ADAMTS1,
- CTGF, and
- NRP1,

== See also ==
- Vascular endothelial growth factor
- Bevacizumab (or Avastin) anti VEGF-A human antibody drug.
