= Retinography =

Retinography is imaging of the retina and may refer to:

- Retinal scan, a biometric technique to identify people
- Ophthalmoscopy, diagnostic examination of the retina and other structures in the fundus of the eye
