= Fundus photography =

Medical imaging of the eyes

- ICD-9-CM: 95.11

Fundus photography involves photographing the rear of an eye, also known as the fundus. An alternative or complement to ophthalmoscopy, specialized fundus cameras consisting of an intricate microscope attached to a flash enabled camera are used in fundus photography. The main structures that can be visualized on a fundus photo are the central and peripheral retina, optic disc and macula. Fundus photography can be performed with colored filters, or with specialized dyes including fluorescein and indocyanine green.

The models and technology of fundus photography have advanced and evolved rapidly over the last century.

== History ==
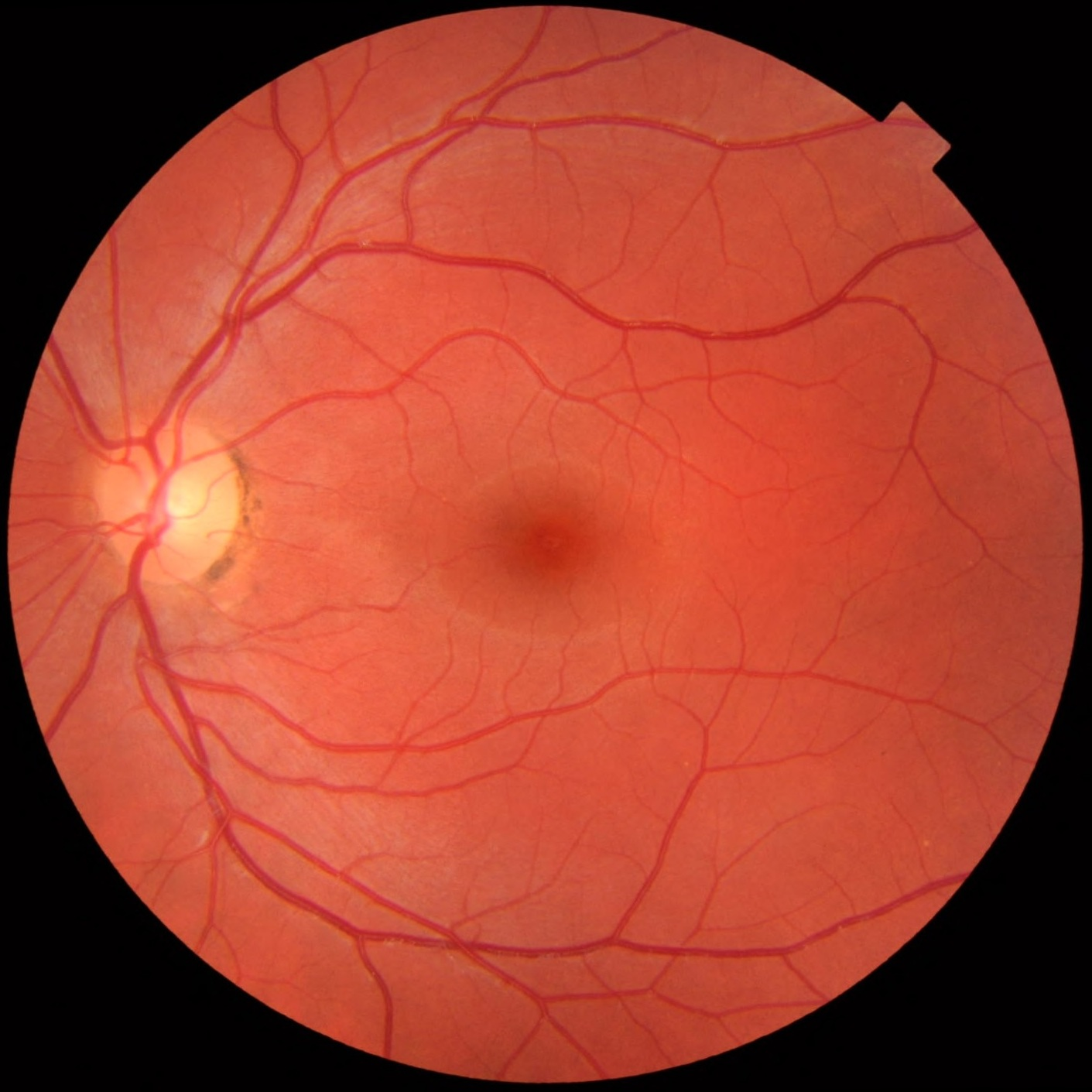
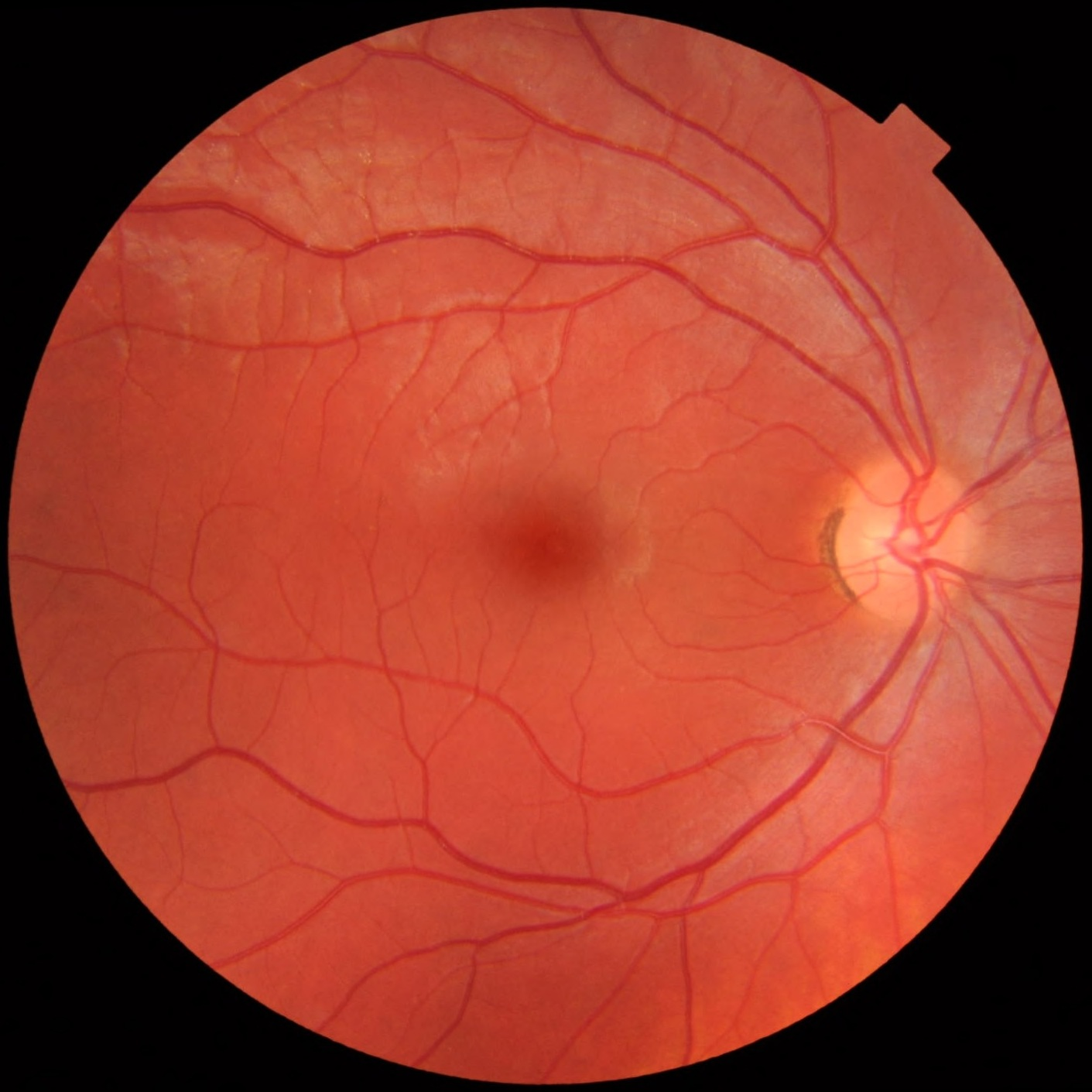
Normal fundus photographs of the left eye (left image) and right eye (right image), in a front view so that left in each image is to the person's right. Each fundus has no sign of disease or pathology. The gaze is into the camera, so in each picture the macula is in the center of the image, and the optic disk is located towards the nose. Both optic disks have some pigmentation at the perimeter of the lateral side, which is considered normal (non-pathological). The orange appearance of the normal fundus is due to complexes of vitamin A as 11-cis-retinal with opsin proteins in the retina (i.e., rhodopsin). The right image (right eye) shows lighter areas close to larger vessels, which is regarded as a normal finding in younger people.

The concept of fundus photography was first introduced in the mid 19th century, after the introduction of photography in 1839. In 1851, Hermann von Helmholtz introduced the ophthalmoscope, and James Clerk Maxwell presented a colour photography method in 1861.

In the early 1860s, Henry Noyes and Abner Mulholland Rosebrugh both assembled fundus cameras and tried fundus photography on animals. Early fundus photos were limited by insufficient light, long exposures, eye movement, and prominent corneal reflexes that reduced the clarity detail. It would be several decades before these problems could be rectified.

There has been some controversy regarding the first-ever successful human fundus photo. Most accounts credit William Thomas Jackman and J.D. Webster, since they published their technique, along with a reproduction of a fundus image, in two photography periodicals in 1886. Three other names played a prominent role in early fundus photography. According to some historical accounts, Elmer Starr and Lucien Howe may have been first to photograph the human retina. Lucien Howe, a well-known name in ophthalmology, and his assistant, Elmer Starr, collaborated on the fundus photography project in 1886–88. Howe described their results as the first "recognizable" fundus photograph, apparently a nod to Jackman & Webster being the first to "publish" a fundus photograph. Based on the written accounts, Howe and Starr's image was more "recognizable" as a fundus.

There was a brief period of watercolor fundus paintings in the early 20th century. William Adams Frost published a treatise on fundus with 157 colored plates showing retina in various healthy and diseased conditions. George Lindsay Johnson used a handheld ophthalmoscope to create those of human retina in various conditions, and also of most clades of mammals, amphibians, and reptiles. These were printed on plates in various publications (see his page for a complete bibliography). Casey Albert Wood meanwhile worked exclusively on the fundus of various birds. Both were done in collaboration with the artist Arthur William Head.

Efforts to clearly photograph the fundus have been ongoing for 75 years. Hundreds of specialists worked to overcome the problem, which was finally achieved in the early 20th century by Friedrich Dimmer, who published his photographs in 1921. Dimmer's fundus camera, developed about 1904, was a complicated and sophisticated research tool and it was not until 1926 that Stockholm's Johan Nordenson and the Zeiss Camera Company were able to market a commercial device for use by practitioners, which was the first modern Fundus camera. Since then, the features of fundus cameras have improved drastically to include non-mydriatic imaging, electronic illumination control, automated eye alignment, and high-resolution digital image capture. These improvements have helped make modern fundus photography a standard ophthalmic practice for documenting retinal disease.

After the development of fundus photography, David Alvis, and Harold Novotny, performed the first fluorescein angiography (FFA) in 1959, using the Zeiss fundus camera with electronic flash. This development was a huge feat in the world of ophthalmology.

Around 2008, several countries began large-scale teleophthalmology programs using digital fundus photography.

== Fundus camera ==
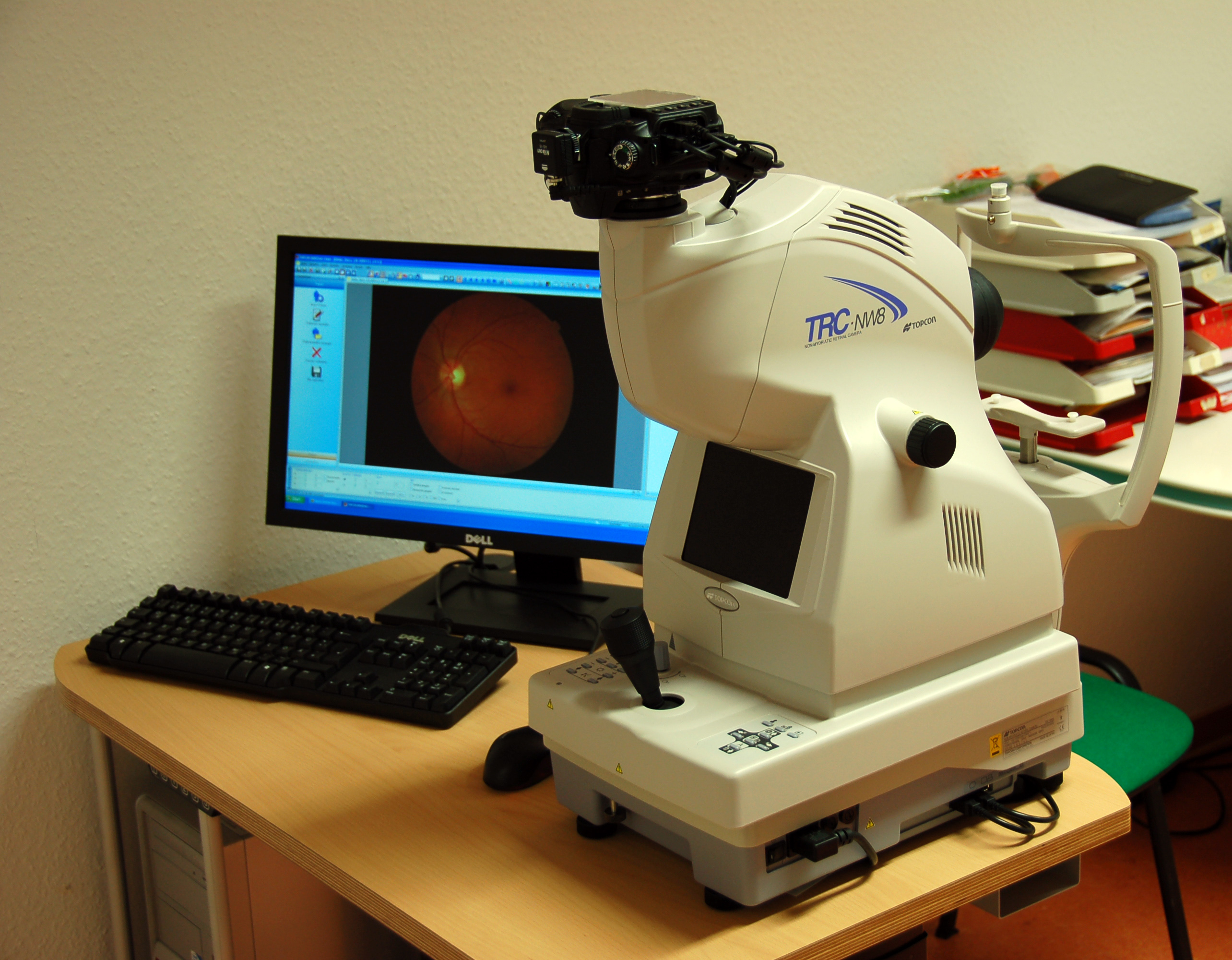
A fundus camera

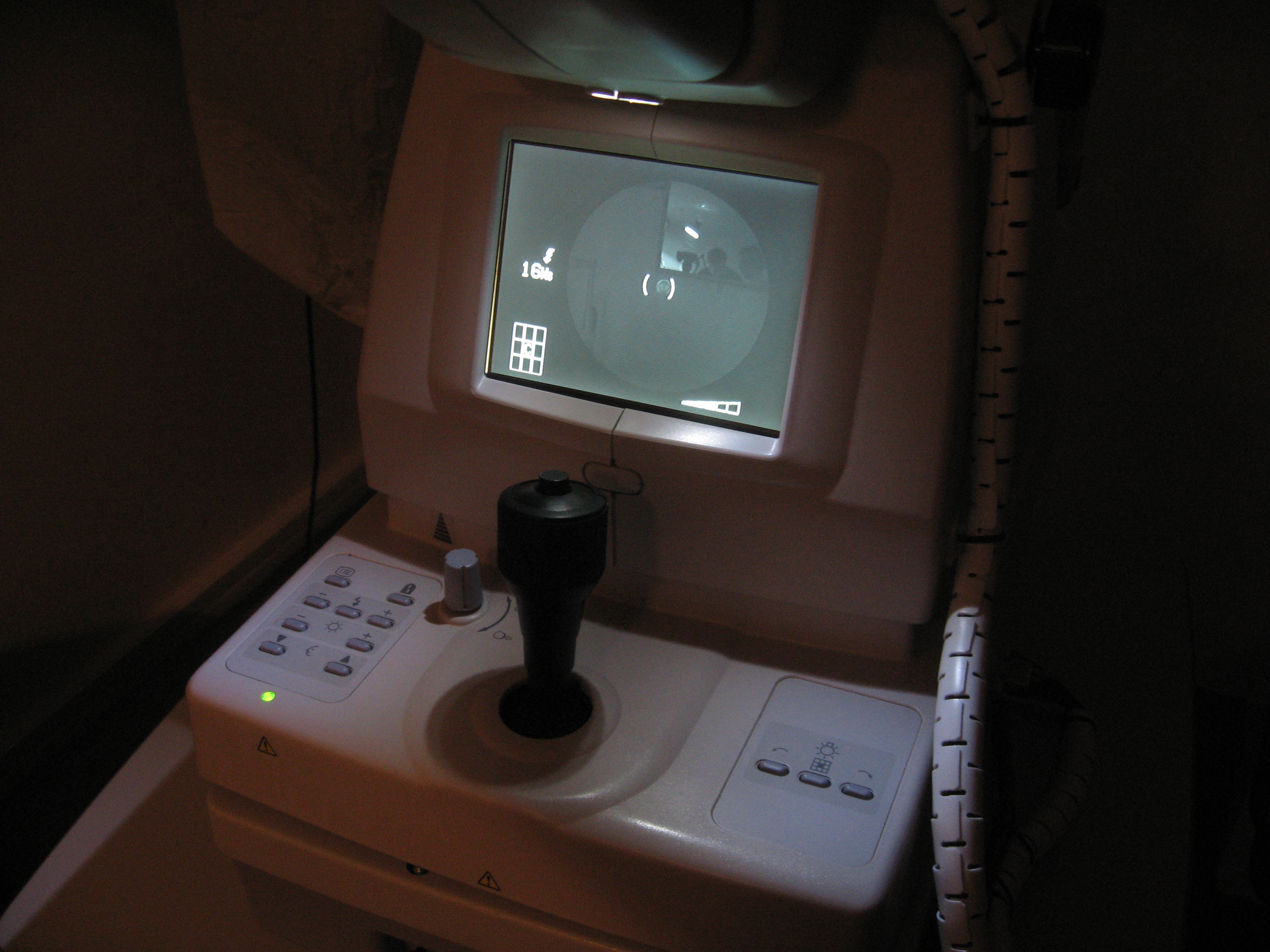
A close-up of the controls of a Topcon retinal camera

=== Optical principles ===
The optical design of fundus cameras is based on the principle of monocular indirect ophthalmoscopy. A fundus camera provides an upright, magnified view of the fundus. A typical camera views 30 to 50° of retinal area, with a magnification of 2.5x, and allows some modification of this relationship through zoom or auxiliary lenses from 15°, which provides 5x magnification, to 140° with a wide angle lens, which minifies the image by half. The optics of a fundus camera are similar to those of an indirect ophthalmoscope in that the observation and illumination systems follow dissimilar paths.

The observation light is focused via a series of lenses through a doughnut-shaped aperture, which then passes through a central aperture to form an annulus, before passing through the camera objective lens and through the cornea onto the retina. The light reflected from the retina passes through the un-illuminated hole in the doughnut formed by the illumination system. As the light paths of the two systems are independent, there are minimal reflections of the light source captured in the formed image. The image forming rays continue towards the low powered telescopic eyepiece. When the button is pressed to take a picture, a mirror interrupts the path of the illumination system allow the light from the flash bulb to pass into the eye. Simultaneously, a mirror falls in front of the observation telescope, which redirects the light onto the capturing medium, whether it is film or a digital CCD. Because of the eye's tendency to accommodate while looking through a telescope, it is imperative that the exiting vergence is parallel in order for an in-focus image to be formed on the capturing medium.

=== Modes ===
Practical instruments for fundus photography perform the following modes of examination:

- Color, where the retina is illuminated by white light and examined in full colour.
- Red free fundus photography utilizes a filter in order to better observe superficial lesions and some vascular abnormalities within the retina and surrounding tissue. A green filter ~540–570 nm is used to block out red wavelengths of light. That allows a better contrast for viewing retinal blood vessels and associated hemorrhages, pale lesions such as drusen and exudates, and subtle characteristics such as nerve fibre layer defects and epiretinal membranes. This is a method of better observing intraretinal microvascular abnormalities, neovascularization at the disc and elsewhere in Diabetic retinopathy progression assessment. Red free photography is also regularly used as a base line photo prior to Angiography.
- Angiography is a process of photographing/recording vascular flow within the retina and surrounding tissue by injecting a fluorescent dye into the blood stream. The dye fluoresces a different color when light from a specific wavelength (excitation colour) reaches it. Barrier filters then only allow the auto-fluorescent wavelengths of light to be photographed. Using this method a sequence of photographs can be produced that show the movement, and pooling of blood over time ("Phases") as the dye passes through the retina and choroid.
  - Sodium Fluorescein Angiography (abbreviated SFA, FA or FAG) is used for the imaging of retinal vascular disease and utilises blue excitation light of ~490 nm and fluoresces a yellow light of ~530 nm. It is routinely used to image Cystoid Macular Oedema and Diabetic Retinopathy among others.
  - Indocyanine Green Angiography (abbreviated ICG) is used primarily for imaging deeper choroidal diseases and utilises near-infrared diode laser of 805 nm and barrier filters allow light of 500 and 810 nm to be photographed. ICG is useful for seeing choroidal vessel outpouching in cases of idiopathic polypoidal choroidal vasculopathy, abnormal vessels supplying ocular tumors, hyperpermeable vessels leading to central serous chorioretinopathy among other conditions.
- Simultaneous stereo fundus photos have been published prior to 1909 however their use as a diagnostic tool is not widespread. Recent advances in digital photography and 3D monitors has seen some manufacturers incorporating it once again into photographic equipment. The current process involves simultaneously photographing the retina from two slightly different angles. These two images are later used together to create a 3D image. In this way the image can be analysed giving better information about surface characteristics of the retina.
- Fundus photography in animals: Fundus photography is a useful tool used for veterinary research and veterinary ophthalmology, as well as education. Numerous studies have used it as a research method for the study of ocular and systemic conditions in animals.

== Indications ==
Fundus photographs are ocular documentation that record the appearance of a patient's retina. Optometrists, ophthalmologists, orthoptists and other trained medical professionals use fundus photography for monitoring the progression of certain eye condition/diseases. Fundus photographs are also used to document abnormalities of disease process affecting the eye, and/or to follow up on the progress of the eye condition/disease such as diabetes, age-macular degeneration (AMD), glaucoma, multiple sclerosis, and neoplasm of the choroid, cranial nerves, retinal or eyeball.

In patients with diabetes mellitus, regular fundus screening examinations (once every six months to one year) are important to screen for diabetic retinopathy as visual loss due to diabetes can be prevented by retinal laser treatment if retinopathy is spotted early. Besides the prevalent ocular condition/diseases, fundus photography can also be used to monitor individuals on anti-malarial therapy, by noting the changes in the fundus during standard screening.

Fundus photography is also used in emergency cases including patients with constant headaches, diastolic pressure greater than or equal to 120mmHg and patients with sudden visual loss. In patients with headaches, the finding of swollen optic discs, or papilloedema, on fundus photography is a key sign. It indicates raised intracranial pressure (ICP) which could be due to hydrocephalus, benign intracranial hypertension (aka pseudotumor cerebri) or brain tumor, among other conditions. Cupped optic discs are seen in glaucoma.

In arterial hypertension, hypertensive changes of the retina closely mimic those in the brain, and may predict cerebrovascular accidents (strokes). In certain cases fundus photography can also be used in research studies.

== Recording and interpretation ==
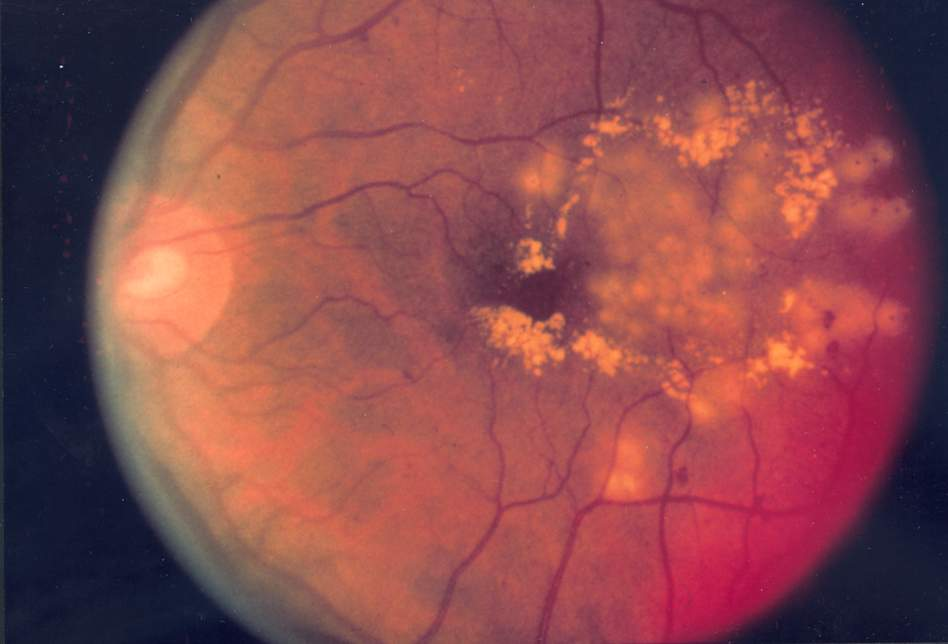
Fundus photography may be used to document the characteristics of diabetic retinopathy such as macular edema and microaneurysms. That is because retinal details may be easier to visualize in fundus photographs as opposed to with direct examination.

The medical necessity of fundus photography must be recorded comprehensively so that the clinician is able to compare photographs of a patient from different timelines.

Documents of a patient's medical record must consist of a recent, relevant history, progress notes and fundus photographs depicting and supporting the relevant diagnosis. The photographs need to be labelled appropriately such as which eye, the date, and patient details. The patient's records should contain documented outcomes of the fundus photography as well as a depiction of variations from previous photographs. They should have an interpretation of those results and the relevant changes it could have on treatment plan. Fundus photographs without an interpretation are seen as obsolete. The records should be legible, and contain suitable patient information and clinician details.

The interpretation of fundus photographs that are glaucomatous must contain a description of the vertical and horizontal cup to disc ratio, vessel pattern, diffuse or focal pallor, asymmetry and development of the above factors. The retinal nerve fiber layer should be studied and commented on.

== Advantages and disadvantages ==
The retina consists of ten semi-transparent layers which serve specific functions in the process of visual perception. Fundus photography provides a bird's-eye view of the top most layer, the inner limiting membrane, as well as the other underlying layers. As retinal abnormalities often begin in a particular layer of the retina before encroaching into the other layers (such as the formation of cotton wool spots in the nerve fiber layer), it is important to be able to appreciate depth when examining a fundus in order to provide an accurate diagnosis. However, despite recent advancements in technology and the development of stereo fundus cameras, which are able to provide three dimensional images by superimposing two images, most fundus cameras in circulation are only able to provide two dimensional images of the fundus. This limitation currently prevents the technology from superseding the current gold standard which is indirect binocular ophthalmoscopy.

These are some of the advantages and disadvantages of fundus photography:

Advantages	Disadvantages
Quick and simple technique to master; Observes a larger retinal field at any one time compared with ophthalmoscopy; Dilation not required, making it a less invasive procedure than traditional methods; High patient compliance; Images can be saved and used at a later time or by different clinicians; Progression of diseases can be monitored over time, allowing for better management plans; Different filters and dyes available to allow for different types tests	Image produced is two-dimensional, unlike 3D in indirect binocular ophthalmoscopy; Difficulty observing and assessing abnormalities (e.g. cotton wool spots) due to lack of depth appreciation on images; Less magnification and image clarity than indirect ophthalmoscopy; Conditions such as cataracts will reduce image clarity; Artifact errors may produce unusual images; Lack of portability; High cost; Brief discomfort and disruption to vision caused by the flash; Flash can elicit ocular migraine in susceptible individuals

== See also ==
- Dilated fundus examination
- Optical coherence tomography, commonly used for imaging the structure of the retina
