= Runcaciguat =

Chemical compound

Legal status
- Legal status: Investigational

Identifiers
- IUPAC name: (3S)-3-[4-Chloro-3-[[(2S,3R)-2-(4-chlorophenyl)-4,4,4-trifluoro-3-methylbutanoyl]amino]phenyl]-3-cyclopropylpropanoic acid
- CAS Number: 1402936-61-1
- PubChem CID: 134440946
- DrugBank: sf
- ChemSpider: 75533796
- UNII: 5EZ01YDT5S
- ChEMBL: ChEMBL4650322

Chemical and physical data
- Formula: C_{23}H_{22}Cl_{2}F_{3}NO_{3}
- Molar mass: 488.33 g·mol^{−1}
- 3D model (JSmol): Interactive image
- SMILES: C[C@H]([C@@H](C1=CC=C(C=C1)Cl)C(=O)NC2=C(C=CC(=C2)[C@@H](CC(=O)O)C3CC3)Cl)C(F)(F)F
- InChI: InChI=1S/C23H22Cl2F3NO3/c1-12(23(26,27)28)21(14-4-7-16(24)8-5-14)22(32)29-19-10-15(6-9-18(19)25)17(11-20(30)31)13-2-3-13/h4-10,12-13,17,21H,2-3,11H2,1H3,(H,29,32)(H,30,31)/t12-,17+,21+/m1/s1; Key:NCRMKIWHFXSBGZ-CNBXIYLPSA-N

Runcaciguat is a soluble guanylate cyclase activator developed by Bayer for non-proliferative diabetic retinopathy and chronic kidney disease.
