= Tele-epidemiology =

Use of telecommunications in epidemiology

Tele-epidemiology is the application of telecommunications to epidemiological research and application, including space-based and internet-based systems.

Tele-epidemiology applies satellite communication systems to investigate or support investigations of infectious disease outbreak, including disease reemergence. In this application, space-based systems (i.e. GIS, GPS, SPOT5) use natural index and in-situ data (i.e. NDVI, Meteosat, Envisat) to assess health risk to human and animal populations. Space-based applications of tele-epidemiology extend to health surveillance and health emergency response.

Internet-based applications of tele-epidemiology include sourcing of epidemiological data in generating internet reports and real-time disease mapping. This entails gathering and structuring epidemiological data from news and social media outlets, and mapping or reporting this data for application with research or public health organizations. Examples of such applications include HealthMap and ProMED-mail, two web-based services that map and e-mail global cases of disease outbreak, respectively.

The United Nations Office for Outer Space Affairs often refers generally to telehealth for applications linking communication and information technologies such as telesurgery and telenursing, to healthcare administration.

== Clinical applications ==
- Provides real-time information about disease prevalence across populations to public health, physicians and citizens, globally.
- Diminishes communicable disease risk by mobilizing local medical efforts to respond to disease outbreaks, especially in vulnerable populations.
- Enhances the ability of managing the proliferation of communicable pathogens.
- Can be used as a management tool in public health to discover, assess, and act on epidemiological data. For example, gathering and identifying disease relevant risk factors helps to identify treatment interventions and implement the prevention strategies that could lessen the effects of the outbreak on the general population and improve clinical outcomes at the individual, patient-leve
- Could prove useful to commerce, travelers, public health agencies and federal governments, and diplomatic efforts.
- Public health agencies and federal governments might take advantage of Tele-epidemiology for predicting the propagation of communicable diseases.
- Provides users and governments with information for early warning systems.

== Non-clinical applications ==
- Applications of tele-epidemiology are not being used frequently in clinical settings
- The use of space-based systems are important for research and public health efforts, though these activities are driven largely by secondary or tertiary organizations, not the public health agencies themselves.
- Relevant data can be used for research and is widely accessible through existing internet outlets.
- Data can be disseminated through internet reports of disease outbreak for real-time disease mapping for public use. The application of HealthMap and ProMED-mail demonstrate considerable global health utility and accessibility for users from both the public and private domains.
- Internet-based platforms can be used by the general public to determine local and international disease outbreaks. Consumers can also contribute their own epidemiologically relevant data to these services.

== Advantages ==
Space-based tele-epidemiological initiatives, using satellites, are able to gather environmental information relevant to tracking disease outbreaks. S2E, a French multidisciplinary consortium on spatial surveillance of epidemics, has used satellites to garner relevant information on vegetation, meteorology and hydrology. This information, in concert with clinical data from humans and animals, can be used to construct predictive mathematical models that may allow for the forecasting of disease outbreaks.

Web-based tele-epidemiological services are able to aggregate information from several disparate sources to provide information on disease surveillance and potential disease outbreaks. Both ProMED-mail and Healthmap collect information in several different languages to gather worldwide epidemiological information. These services are both free and allow both health care professionals and laypeople to access reliable disease outbreak information from around the world and in real-time.

== Disadvantages ==
Space-based methodologies require investment of resources for the collection and management of epidemiological information; as such, these systems may not be affordable or technologically feasible for developing countries that need assistance tracking disease outbreaks. Further, the success of space-based methodologies is predicated on the collection of accurate ground-based data by qualified public health professionals. This may not be possible in developing countries because they lack basic laboratory and epidemiological resources

Web-based tele-epidemiological initiatives have a unique set of challenges that are different from those experienced by space-based methodologies. HealthMap, in an effort to provide comprehensive worldwide information, contains information from a variety of sources including eyewitness accounts, online news and validated official reports. As a result, the site necessarily relies upon third party information, the veracity of which they are not liable.

== See also ==
- Landscape epidemiology
- Satellite imagery
- Telehealth
- Telematics
- Telemedicine
- Telenursing
- Teleophthalmology
