= Vicasinabin =

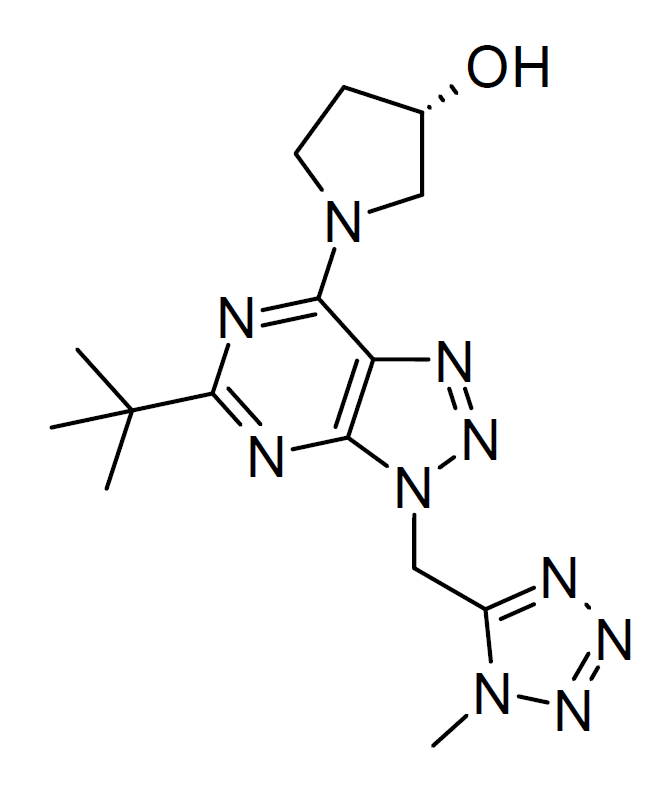

Identifiers
- IUPAC name: (3S)-1-[5-tert-butyl-3-[(1-methyltetrazol-5-yl)methyl]triazolo[4,5-d]pyrimidin-7-yl]pyrrolidin-3-ol
- CAS Number: 1433361-02-4
- PubChem CID: 86296048
- ChemSpider: 115010437
- UNII: QJ8UO6C05M
- KEGG: D12511
- ChEMBL: ChEMBL5314566

Chemical and physical data
- Formula: C_{15}H_{22}N_{10}O
- Molar mass: 358.410 g·mol^{−1}
- 3D model (JSmol): Interactive image
- SMILES: CC(C)(C)C1=NC2=C(C(=N1)N3CC[C@@H](C3)O)N=NN2CC4=NN=NN4C
- InChI: InChI=1S/C15H22N10O/c1-15(2,3)14-16-12(24-6-5-9(26)7-24)11-13(17-14)25(21-19-11)8-10-18-20-22-23(10)4/h9,26H,5-8H2,1-4H3/t9-/m0/s1; Key:MAYZWDRUFKUGGP-VIFPVBQESA-N

Vicasinabin (RG7774) is a potent cannabinoid agonist which is highly selective for the CB_{2} receptor subtype. It was developed by Roche as a potential agent for the treatment of diabetic retinopathy. It reached Phase II human clinical trials but was discontinued for lack of efficacy, although it continues to be used for scientific research.
