= Ophthalmogram =

An ophthalmogram is a documentation or picture related to the eye, such as:

- An image created in fundus photography, which can be produced by a fundus camera
- A record of an eye tracking
