= Teleophthalmology =

Eye care delivered through telecommunication

Healthy eye fundus viewed through a retinal camera

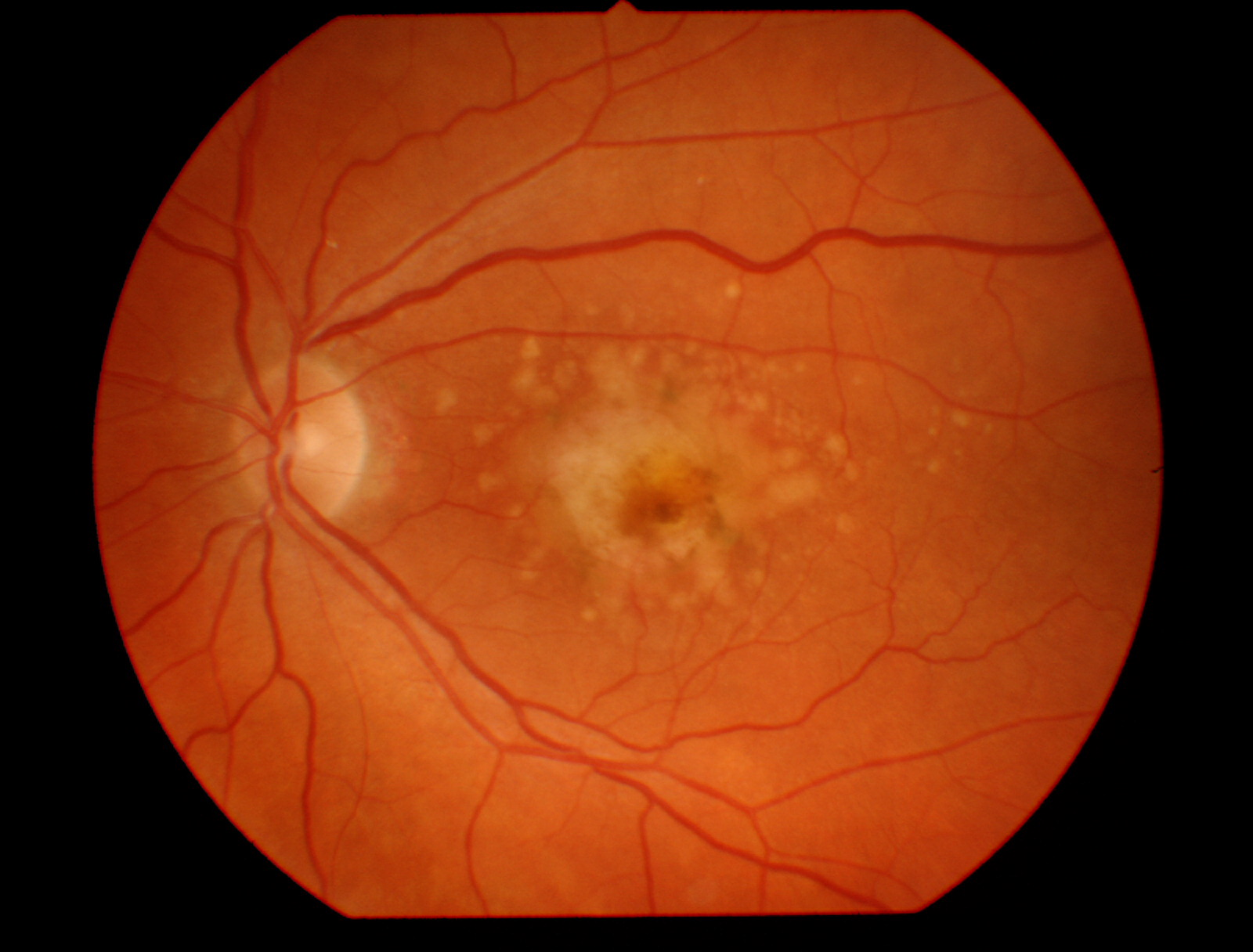
Retinal image with signs of macular degeneration

Teleophthalmology is a branch of telemedicine that delivers eye care through digital medical equipment and telecommunications technology. Today, applications of teleophthalmology encompass access to eye specialists for patients in remote areas, ophthalmic disease screening, diagnosis and monitoring; as well as distant learning.

Teleophthalmology (also known as tele-retina) offers several advantages. It eliminates the need for patients to travel to major medical centers or endure long wait times for specialist appointments. Instead, trained technicians or nurses can acquire eye images, typically fundus photographs and optical coherence tomography (OCT) scans, and transmit them securely online to ophthalmologists for review. This allows for efficient triage, identifying patients requiring in-person examinations and determining the urgency of their needs. Teleophthalmology provides a cost-effective diagnostic method, particularly beneficial in reaching remote populations and screening individuals at higher risk of eye diseases, such as those with diabetes.

== Implementation ==
Although ocular photography has been present since the early 1980s, the transfer of digital images from one location to another for assessment is a relatively recent phenomenon. The rise of digital imaging in the early 1990s allowed ophthalmologists and optometrists to capture images and store them on computers for future assessment. The advent of the Internet allowed for the digital transfer of these ocular images from one location to another.

Current teleophthalmological solutions are generally focused on a particular eye problem, such as diabetic retinopathy, retinopathy of prematurity, macular degeneration, strabismus and adnexal eye diseases. Less common conditions that can be revealed using retinal images are arterial and vein occlusions, chorioretinitis, congenital anomalies, and tapetoretinal abitrophy. Several population-based studies have used retinal imaging to relate ophthalmic abnormalities to general conditions, including hypertension, renal dysfunction, cardiovascular mortality, subclinical and clinical stroke, and cognitive impairment.

Mobile applications are widely available in ophthalmology and optometry as tools for eye tests (visual acuity, colour test, and viewing eye images) and for educational purposes. Technological advancements in digital ocular imaging devices are perceived by many as key drivers for teleophthalmology. Recently, emerging retinal imaging modalities such as optical coherence tomography are capable of producing digital images of the retina with a micrometer resolution, which can be transmitted for research or diagnostic purposes. Along with systems designed for health care professionals, patient-centred systems such as Eye-File for use by the general public are emerging.

== Process ==
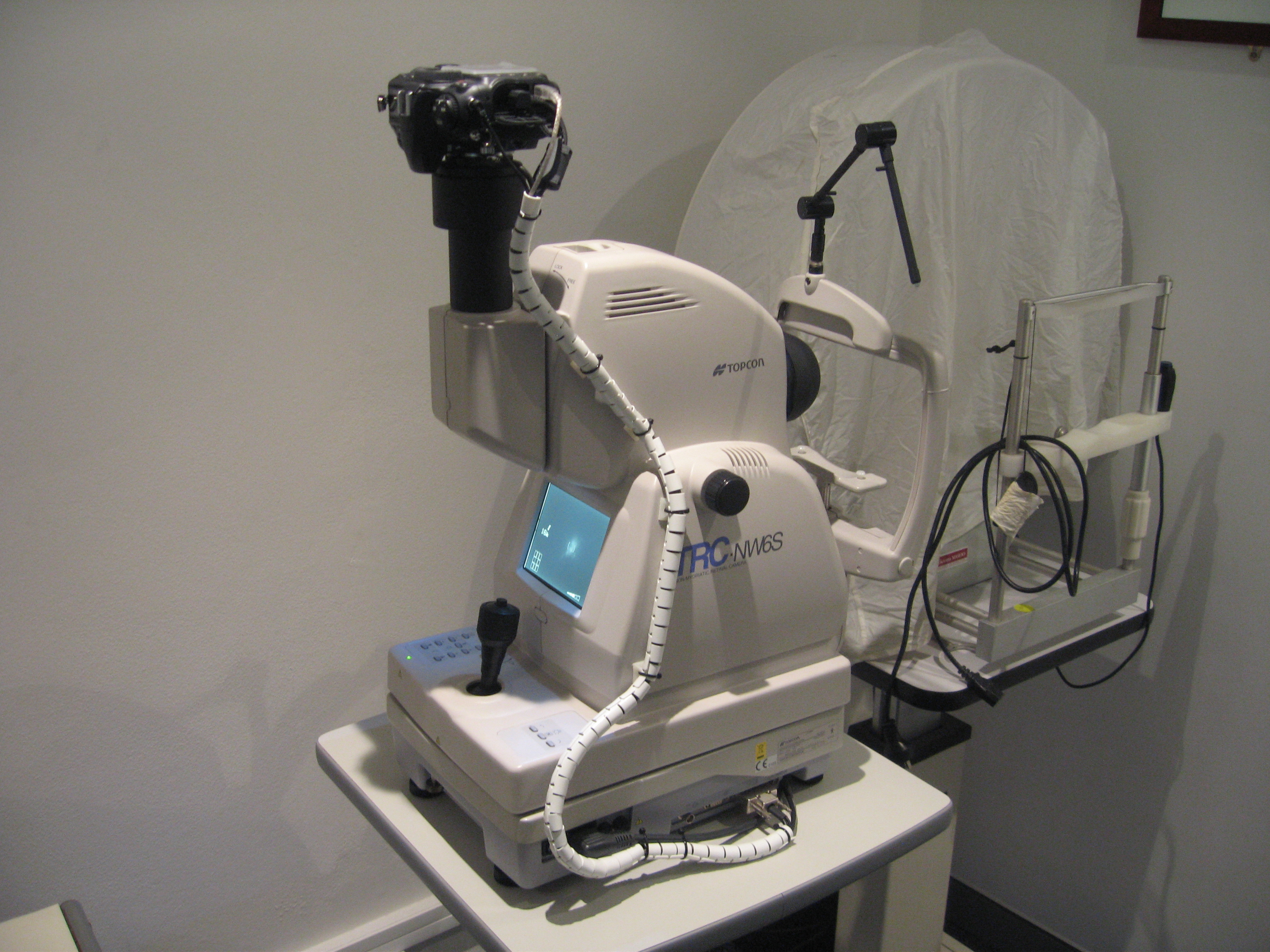
A non-mydriatic Topcon retinal camera

Fundus photography is performed by a fundus camera, which basically consists of a specialized low power microscope with an attached camera.

Teleophthalmology services can be provided primarily in two ways synchronously or asynchronously:

- Synchronous teleophthalmology enables real-time interaction between participants (using standard telemedicine technologies e.g. video-conferencing), synchronous to supervise the removal of corneal foreign bodies and for consultations.
- Asynchronous teleophthalmology in a "store-and-forward" method, where data is captured and transmitted for review at a later time.

Images of the eye can be captured non-invasively through various methods, generally by a technician or non-physician health care professional.

- External eye: standard digital stills or video camera
- Anterior segment: slit lamp connected to a camera
- Posterior segment or retina: fundus camera

Mydriasis (pupil dilation, e.g. using tropicamide) may be required to obtain an image of sufficient quality. Stereoscopy may be used to detect retinal thickening. The image can then be transferred, over the Internet or dedicated network to a physician for immediate examination, or for storage and later review. Ideally, the image is encrypted or anonymized for transmission, to protect patient confidentiality. Between image capture and viewing, image processing may be done, including compression, enhancement and edge-detection. Image evaluation, to detect various pathologies in the case of asynchronous evaluation, is often done by an ophthalmologist, optometrist or primary care physician, though it is also performed by specially trained staff. Image evaluation may also be automated to provide pathology detection or grading.

== Automated image recognition ==
Computer software applications have been tasked with the automated assessment of retinal images to recognize lesions associated with an ocular disease of interest. The clinical process entails initially discriminating retinal lesions from non-factor artifacts, subsequently distinguishing lesions associated with the disease in question from other types of lesions, and finally grading the disease according to guideline-endorsed severity scales set by medical authorities.

Dedicated research in artificial intelligence drives the underlying technology in automated image recognition. Specific approaches involve pattern recognition using trained artificial neural networks; feature extraction using edge-detection and region-growing techniques; and content-based comparison with previously adjudicated samples.

== Advantages ==
- Improved patient care
- Strengthened referral patterns
- Extended patient care and expertise to remote areas
- Education of hospital staff, clinicians and the community
- Cost-effectiveness
- More effective planning and administrative meetings with point-and-click sharing of content
- Use of videoconferencing to members of the human resources department has helped to resolve emergency staffing issues
- Community nurses, ophthalmologists or optometrists in training can attend teaching sessions at the main hospital via a live video teleopthamological feed, thereby enhancing their knowledge and skills.

== Implemented projects by country ==
=== Australia ===
A 100-case audit of retinal screening by optometrists was performed in the remote areas of Western Australia. Projects are now being started base on this pilot experience.

=== Canada ===
A number of teleophthalmology programs exist in Canada, including those in the provinces of Alberta, British Columbia, Manitoba, Newfoundland, Ontario, and Quebec.

The cost of taking the images and of the ophthalmologist to interpret the images is covered by public-funded health care insurance. Typically a registered nurse or registered practical nurse is trained to dilate the patient's pupils and take the images.

Key challenges to providing teleophthalmology services in Canada are likely: 1) the high staff turnover in remote areas; 2) the lack of an inexpensive mobile imaging device that takes diagnostic quality images; and 3) the difficulty securing public funds where the costs are incurred and savings are realized from separate funding envelopes.

==== Alberta ====
Teleophthalmology has been provided in Alberta since 2003, and is supported by Alberta Health Services, using their proprietary teleophthalmology software Secure Diagnostic Imaging. Approximately six ophthalmologists from the University of Alberta review the images. As of January 2014, approximately 15,000 patients had been screened for diabetic retinopathy, across 15 community-hospital-based stationary locations, 44 First Nations communities and five primary care practices. Approximately 130 patients are screened per month across these locations. The teleophthalmology program also facilitates approximately 55 optometrist-to-ophthalmologist referrals per month.

==== British Columbia ====
Teleophthalmology is provided by ophthalmologists from the University of British Columbia, and is supported by Alberta Health Service's proprietary Secure Diagnostic Imaging software.

==== Manitoba ====
In Manitoba, teleophthalmology is provided by ophthalmologists at the University of Manitoba, and is supported using Alberta Health Service's proprietary Secure Diagnostic Imaging software.

==== Newfoundland ====
A teleophthalmology program was started in the Eastern Health Region of Newfoundland, under one of four regional health authorities. This program was started in May 2012 and is supported by an ophthalmologist in St. John's. The program uses Synergy software by TopCon Canada Inc.

==== Ontario ====
Thirteen teleophthalmology programs currently exist in Ontario. Two of the programs facilitate ophthalmology support for premature infants, screening for retinopathy of prematurity (RoP), using ophthalmologists at Sick Kids and McMaster University Medical Centre.

The other eleven of these teleophthalmology programs primarily screen for diabetic retinopathy in diabetic patients who have limited access to eye care professionals, or who for various reasons do not seek regular eye care. Ten of these eleven programs use the Ontario Telemedicine Network teleophthalmology (TOP) service to transmit images to an ophthalmologist for evaluation. OTN uses Merge Healthcare teleophthalmology software to provide this service. Some of these locations use a fundus camera, others use both fundus and optical coherence tomography (OCT) imaging devices, and all programs dilate their patients' eyes before screening. Since 2009, and as of January 2014, more than 4600 diabetic patients have been screened, finding pathology in approximately 25-35% of screens. Approximately 120 patients are screened per month, by five reading ophthalmologists.

In Ontario, the implementation of teleophthalmology has reduced the average wait time from six months to four weeks, for some diabetic patients to obtain retinal screening from a specialist.

=== China ===
Between 2006 and 2008, a large scale teleretinal screening project using mobile units was implemented in China.

=== France ===
The OPHDIAT Network supports diabetic retinal screening across 34 sites and has screened over 13,000 patients since 2004.

=== India ===
The teleophthalmology program provided in Chennai, India by Sankara Nethralaya has reached more than 450,000 patients since its inception in October, 2003.

The Karnataka Internet Assisted Diagnosis of Retinopathy of Prematurity (KIDROP) program, started in 2008, uses teleophthalmology to screen for retinopathy of prematurity. They are India's first, and the world's largest, program of this kind. They have performed more than 6339 imaging sessions of 1601 infants in rural and remote areas, preventing blindness and finding that non-physician experts can be trained to accurately grade the images.

=== Ireland ===
In 2011, the Health Service Executive announced the development of a diabetic retinopathy screening programme. The Diabetic RetinaScreen programme was rolled out in 2013.

=== Kenya ===
The PEEK (Portable Eye Examination Kit) program has screened 2500 people in Kenya, and incorporates geo-tagging to facilitate follow-up treatment and demographic research.

=== Netherlands ===
Since 2001, more than 30,000 people with diabetes have been screened since 2001 as part of a project called EyeCheck in the Netherlands.

=== United Kingdom ===
In the United Kingdom, more than 1.7 million people with diabetes were screened using digital fundus photography in 2010 and 2011. A pilot project with telemedicine transmission of retinal OCT images from community optometry care to hospital eye services improved the triage of macular patients and swifter care of urgent cases. The project was led by Consultant Ophthalmologist Simon P Kelly, Royal Bolton Hospital and Ian Wallwork, Optometrist, and undertaken in Salford. The project was recognized in an award from the Clinical Leaders Network. In Scotland, NHS Forth Valley has introduced teleophthalmology in standard practice, to link ophthalmologists and emergency services. The technology has been developed in collaboration with the University of Strathclyde, and is currently being piloted in other Scottish health boards.

=== United States ===
The United States Department of Veterans Health Affairs was one of the first organizations to deploy a large-scale teleretinal imaging program starting in 1999. In 2006, this program was expanded and received further funding for a nationwide program. As of 2010, more than 120,000 patients have been screened through the program.

== Standards and regulations ==
Teleophthalmology relies on a standard for the representation, storage, and transmission of medical images known as Digital Imaging and Communications in Medicine (DICOM). The medical imaging standard is managed by the Medical Imaging & Technology Alliance (MITA), which is a division of the Virginia-based National Electrical Manufacturers Association (NEMA).

Various regulations exist on national levels that govern the use of teleophthalmological solutions. Some of them are listed below:

- USA - Health Insurance Portability and Accountability Act - licensure laws in the U.S. require a practitioner to obtain a full license to deliver telemedicine care across state lines where regulations vary.
- Europe - Data Protection Directive
- Japan - HPB 517

== Future direction and considerations ==
Emerging techniques for eye image capture include ophthalmoscopes that can be combined with mobile devices, increasing portability and accessibility to the general public. The introduction of full auto focusing retinal cameras has the potential to reduce the need for operators.

Telehealth networks are growing in number, and advancements are being made in automated detection methods for diseases such as diabetic retinopathy. Teleophthalmology has the potential to improve access to screening and early treatment for a number of ocular conditions. It serves to identify patients who are at risk of various types of retinopathy and allows further evaluation and early management resulting in considerable economic benefit.

A recent Cochrane review notes that no randomized controlled trials or controlled clinical trials have been published evaluating whether there are any benefits or harms to telerehabilitation, over inpatient care for improving vision outcomes. The authors note that the lack of published research in teleopthalmology may compromise possible funding or support for these services.

=== Current technological limitations ===
Despite ongoing research and advancement in digital photography, digital imaging techniques still face certain barriers, including low sensitivity and specificity, as well as lack of stereopsis (impression of depth). As such, teleophthalmology cannot be a true substitute for comprehensive eye examinations using traditional binocular observation with standard 7-field stereoscopic fundus photography.

Automated image recognition algorithms are gaining in clinical adoption. While they perform at a level nearly equivalent to humans in ascertaining low and high risk states, diagnosis and grading performance is still insufficient for clinical acceptance.
