= Landscape epidemiology =

Field of study

Landscape epidemiology draws some of its roots from the field of landscape ecology. Just as the discipline of landscape ecology is concerned with analyzing both patterns and processes in ecosystems across time and space, landscape epidemiology can be used to analyze both risk patterns and environmental risk factors. This field emerges from the theory that most vectors, hosts, and pathogens are commonly tied to the landscape as environmental determinants control their distribution and abundance. In 1966, Evgeniy Pavlovsky introduced the concept of natural nidality or focality, defined by the idea that microscale disease foci are determined by the entire ecosystem. With the recent availability of new computing technologies such as geographic information systems, remote sensing, statistical methods including spatial statistics and theories of landscape ecology, the concept of landscape epidemiology has been applied analytically to a variety of disease systems, including malaria, hantavirus, Lyme disease and Chagas' disease.

== See also ==
- Tele-epidemiology
