= Dilated fundus examination =

Method of viewing the interior of the eye

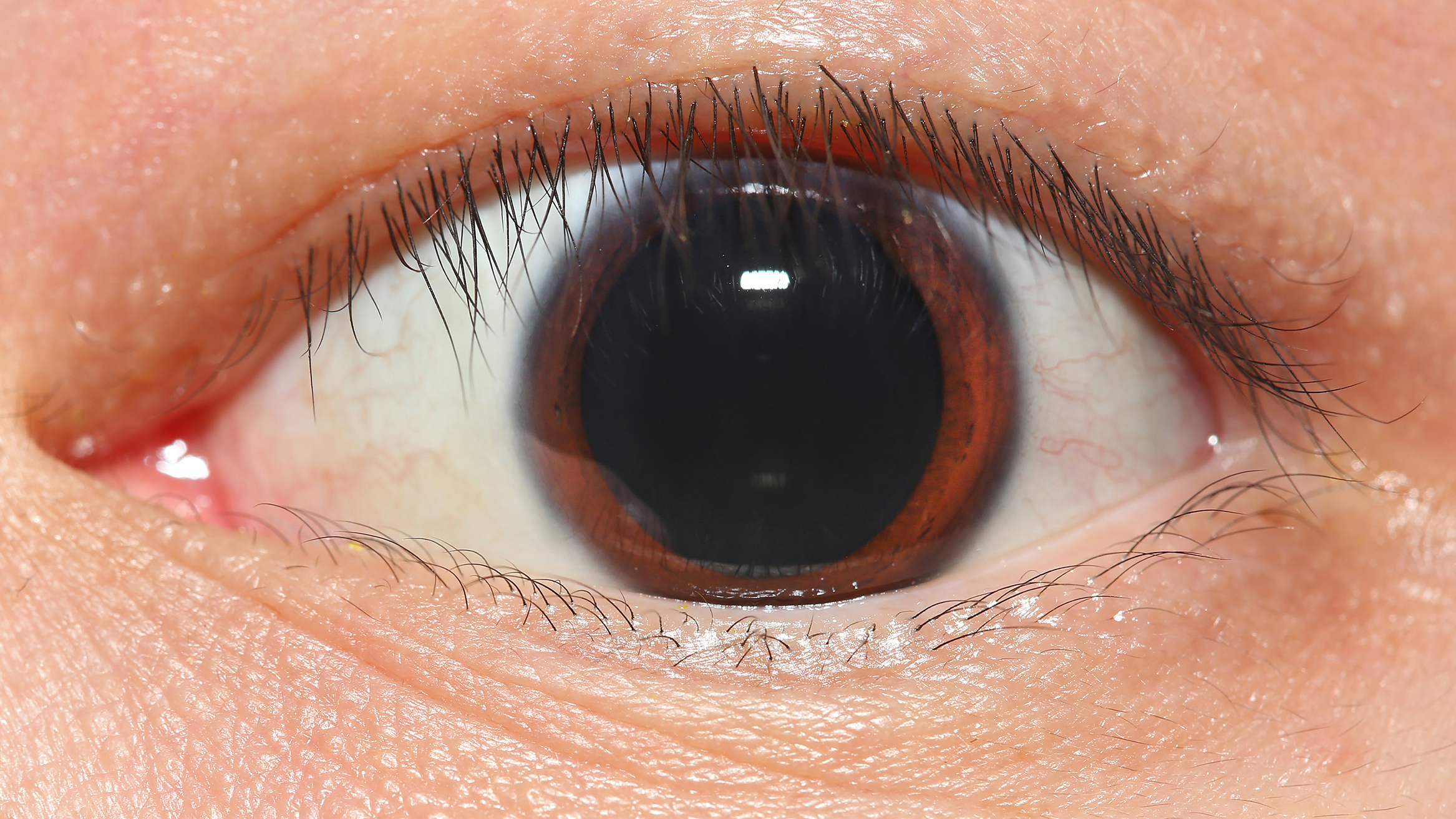
- Dilated pupil of an eye, measuring 9 mm in diameter
- Synonyms: Dilated-pupil fundus examination
- Purpose: Obtain a better view of the fundus of eye.

Dilated fundus examination (DFE) is a diagnostic procedure that uses mydriatic eye drops to dilate or enlarge the pupil in order to obtain a better view of the fundus of the eye. Once the pupil is dilated, examiners use ophthalmoscopy to view the eye's interior, which makes it easier to assess the retina, optic nerve head, blood vessels, and other important features. DFE has been found to be a more effective method for evaluating eye health when compared to non-dilated examination, and is the best method of evaluating structures behind the iris. It is frequently performed by ophthalmologists and optometrists as part of an eye examination.

== Examination ==
The most common agents used to dilate the pupil are phenylephrine (2.5% in pediatrics or 10% in adults) and tropicamide (0.5% or 1%). While phenylephrine stimulates receptors that contract the dilator muscle of the pupil, tropicamide blocks stimulation of the pupillary sphincter muscle to allow for relaxation. As the insertion of these drops may cause some stinging or burning, some practitioners choose to first insert a drop of topical anesthetic to numb the eye. Pupil dilation typically begins within 15 minutes and may last for 3–8 hours.

After the pupil has been dilated, an ophthalmoscope can be used to examine the fundus. This allows for 15x magnification of the optic disc, also known as the optic nerve head, and retina to better evaluate for any ophthalmic pathology. Evaluation of the optic disc may include noting the color of the disc, the sharpness of the disc outline and if any swelling is present, and signs of an enlarged or bulging optic cup, the central depression in the optic disc. Evaluation of the retina includes examining the arteries and veins for narrowing or arteriovenous nicking, as well as detecting any lesions, exudates, retinal hemorrhages, microaneurysms, or neovascularization.

Following a dilated fundus examination, patients may experience blurred vision and light sensitivity until the effects of the mydriatic eye drops wear off; for this reason, the use of sunglasses is recommended to prevent damage to the eyes while dilated.

=== Common conditions diagnosed during examination ===
- Diabetic Retinopathy: A complication of diabetes mellitus that progressively damages the retina. Examination findings may include microaneurysms, cotton wool spots, dot and blot hemorrhages, and neovascularization. Dilated fundus exam is the preferred method of diagnosis, as undilated exam may be too limited to visualize lesions or neovascularization that are more peripheral.
- Glaucoma: A group of eye diseases that can cause vision loss due to damage to the optic nerve, generally from increased intraocular pressure. Changes on ophthalmologic exam include deepening and enlargement of the optic cup (leading to a high cup/disc ratio), a more vertical oval optic cup shape, pallor of the disc, and an increase in the blood vessels within the optic nerve on the nasal side of the disc. Other disc findings may include notching of the disc, or flame/splinter hemorrhages, which are located in the outer nerve layer.
- Cataracts: An often age-related condition that leads to gradual vision loss secondary to clouding of the lens. Examination may reveal opacification of the lens and often an absent or blunted red reflex. Dilated fundus exam allows for examination of more peripheral cataracts, as well as evaluating candidacy for cataract surgery.
- Age-related macular degeneration: A common cause of central vision loss; early diagnosis via ophthalmologic examination may facilitate slower disease progression. The examiner will evaluate the macula for deposits of cellular debris called drusen, in particular their size, number, and distribution, as well as pigmentary changes, atrophy, and hemorrhage, among other signs.

== Screening guidelines ==
=== Adults ===
The American Academy of Ophthalmology recommends comprehensive eye examinations, including dilated fundus examination, for asymptomatic patients without risk factors for eye disease at varying frequencies based on age: every 5–10 years in adults under 40 years, every 2–4 years in adults aged 40 to 54 years, every 1–3 years in adults aged 55 to 64 years, and every 1 to 2 years in adults aged 65 years and older. However, routine DFE is relatively low yield for asymptomatic patients.

In contrast, individuals with diabetes mellitus are at risk of diabetic retinopathy and therefore require more frequent screening. Those with type 1 diabetes should have their first comprehensive eye examination 5 years after diagnosis, followed by yearly exams. Those with type 2 diabetes should have their first comprehensive eye examination at the time of diagnosis, followed by yearly exams. Women with type 1 or type 2 diabetes who are planning a pregnancy should have a comprehensive eye examination prior to conception as well as early in the first trimester; women with gestational diabetes do not require screening for diabetic retinopathy during pregnancy.

For individuals at risk of developing glaucoma, the American Academy of Ophthalmology recommends screening every 2–5 years in adults under 40 years, every 1–3 years in adults aged 40 to 54 years, every 1–2 years in adults aged 55 to 64 years, and every 1 to 2 years in adults aged 65 years and older. Screenings may be recommended even more frequently for individuals of African or Hispanic/Latino descent, as these ethnic groups have a further increased risk of developing glaucoma.

=== Pediatrics ===
A child's first vision screening is typically done shortly after birth during the newborn exam, during which a pediatrician will perform simple vision testing such as assessing pupillary response and a red reflex. However, if an infant is premature (gestational age under 32 weeks) or has a low birth weight (less than 1500 g) a dilated fundus examination is indicated due to risk of retinopathy of prematurity.

A child will continue to be screened for vision issues, as well as normal eye alignment and movement, at regular intervals during their well child exams; if they fail a vision test or findings are inconclusive, the child can be referred for a more comprehensive eye examination including dilation. A dilated fundus examination will allow for an ophthalmologist to calculate the refractive error more accurately than a non-dilated exam, as children tend to accommodate well; this allows for a more accurate prescription.

Finally, children with certain medical conditions that place them at a higher risk for eye pathology (Down syndrome, juvenile idiopathic arthritis, neurofibromatosis) require comprehensive eye examinations with dilation. Similarly, children with a family history of amblyopia, strabismus, retinoblastoma, congenital cataracts or glaucoma may also require more frequent or comprehensive examinations.

== Contraindications ==
A dilated fundus examination is typically contraindicated in situations where mydriatic eye drops are contraindicated.

Absolute contraindications include:

- History or suspicion of cerebrovascular or neurologic disease (head injury, coma, etc.) due to the need for continual reassessment of pupillary reactions
- Iris clip intraocular lens implants

Relative contraindications include:

- Closed-angle glaucoma, as this may rarely precipitate an acute attack
- Anterior uveitis
- Pregnancy
- Breastfeeding
