= Endostatin =

Endostatin monomer, basic amino acid residues shown in red (source: pdb.org, 1KOE).

Endostatin is a naturally occurring, 20-kDa C-terminal fragment derived from type XVIII collagen. It is reported to serve as an anti-angiogenic agent, similar to angiostatin and thrombospondin.

Endostatin is a broad-spectrum angiogenesis inhibitor and may interfere with the pro-angiogenic action of growth factors such as basic fibroblast growth factor (bFGF/FGF-2) and vascular endothelial growth factor (VEGF).

== Background ==
Endostatin is an endogenous inhibitor of angiogenesis. It was first found secreted in the media of non-metastasizing mouse cells from a hemangioendothelioma cell line in 1997 and was subsequently found in humans, e.g. in platelets. It is produced by proteolytic cleavage of collagen XVIII, a member of the multiplexin family that is characterized by interruptions in the triple helix creating multiple domains, by proteases such as cathepsins. Collagen is a component of epithelial and endothelial basement membranes. Endostatin, as a fragment of collagen 18, demonstrates a role of the ECM in suppression of neoangiogenesis. Pro-angiogenic and anti-angiogenic factors can also be created by proteolysis during coagulation cascades. Endogenous inhibitors of angiogenesis are present in both normal tissue and cancerous tissue. Overall, endostatin down regulates many signaling cascades like ephrin, TNF-α, and NFκB signaling as well as coagulation and adhesion cascades. Other collagen derived antiangiogenic factors include arresten, canstatin, tumstatin, α 6 collagen type IV antiangiogenic fragment, and restin.

== Structure ==
Human monomeric endostatin is a globular protein containing two disulfide bonds: Cys162−302 and Cys264−294. It folds tightly, has a zinc binding domain at the N-terminus of the protein, and has a high affinity for heparin through an 11 arginine basic patch. Endostatin also binds all heparan sulfate proteoglycans with low affinity. Oligomeric endostatin (trimer or dimer) binds mainly with laminin of the basal lamina.

== Biological activity ==
In-vitro studies have shown endostatin blocks the proliferation and organization of endothelial cells into new blood vessels. In animal studies endostatin inhibited angiogenesis and growth of both primary tumors and secondary metastasis.

== Mechanism of action ==
Endostatin suppresses angiogenesis through many pathways affecting both cell viability and movement. Endostatin represses cell cycle control and anti-apoptosis genes in proliferating endothelial cells, resulting in cell death. Endostatin blocks pro-angiogenic gene expression controlled by c-Jun N terminal kinase (JNK) by interfering with TNFα activation of JNK. It reduces the growth of new cells by inhibiting cyclin D1. As a result, cells arrest during G1 phase and enter apoptosis. Alteration of FGF signal transduction by endostatin inhibits the migration of endothelial cells through disruption of cell-matrix adhesions, cell-cell adhesions, and cytoskeletal reorganization. By binding integrin α5β1 on endothelia cells it inhibits the signaling pathways of Ras and Raf kinases and decreases ERK-1 and p38 activity. Endostatin binding and clustering of integrins causes co-localization with caveolin-1 and activates non-receptor tyrosine kinases of the Src family involved in the regulation of cell proliferation, differentiation, and mobility. Other receptor interactions include the VEGF-R2/KDR/Flk-1 receptor on human umbilical vein endothelial cells.

Endostatin may prevent activity from certain metalloproteinase. Several studies have focused on the downstream effects of endostatin reception. These studies have estimated that endostatin may significantly affect 12% of genes used by human endothelial cells. Although endostatin signaling may affect this vast number of genes, the downstream affects appear surprisingly limited. Endostatin reception seems to only affect angiogenesis that arrives from pathogenic sources, such as tumors. Processes associated with angiogenesis, such as wound healing and reproduction, are seemingly not affected by endostatin. The result is possible because pathogenic-derived angiogenesis usually involves signaling through integrins, which are directly affected by endostatin.

== Cancer ==
Although this process by which endostatin works is not fully understood, it involves metalloproteases and endopeptidases that digest components of the extracellular matrix. Several similar endogeneous angiogenic factors are produced from matrix components in this fashion. For example, perlecan degradation can yield endorepellin which functions as an anti-angiogenic factor. Collectively, these products are thought to balance regulation between pro-angiogenic and anti-angiogenic factors outside epithelial and endothelial layers.

Among anti-angiogenesis inhibitors, endostatin has a wide range of anti-cancer spectrum targets, increasing its significance since synthetic inhibitors usually have single targets and struggle with toxicity. Endostatin has several characteristics that may be advantageous to cancer therapy. First of all, endogenous endostatin has been described as "the least toxic anti-cancer drug in mice". Furthermore, neither resistance nor toxicity to endostatin occur in humans. Also, endostatin has been estimated to affect 12% of the human genome. This reveals a broad spectrum of activity focused on preventing angiogenesis. This is very different from single-molecule therapies, and may change how cancer therapies are designed: drugs may be designed to target a wide range of genes instead of one particular protein. However, endostatin does not affect all tumors. For example, cancers that may have extreme pro-angiogenic activity through VEGF may overcome the anti-angiogenic effects of endostatin.

== Possible cancer treatment ==
Endostatin is currently being studied as part of cancer research. Prior results indicated that endostatin can be beneficial in combinations with other medicines, but endostatin alone gave no significant improvements in tumor/disease progression.

=== Phase I ===
In a Phase I clinical trial of Endostatin, of the 19 patients treated, 12 were switched out of the trial by their physicians due to continued progression of their disease. Two patients continued to be treated, and the remaining patients withdrew on their own. The trial, designed primarily to demonstrate safety, indeed showed that the drug was safe and well tolerated (at the dosages used).

=== Phase II ===
In a Phase II clinical trial of Endostatin, 42 patients with pancreatic endocrine tumors or carcinoid tumors were treated. Of the 40 patients which could be evaluated for a radiologic response, none experienced partial response to therapy, as defined by World Health Organization criteria.

The conclusion from the trial was that, "Treatment with Endostatin did not result in significant tumor regression in patients with advanced neuroendocrine tumors."

=== Phase III ===
A phase III clinical trial was carried out on 493 histology or cytology-confirmed stage IIIB and IV NSCLC patients with a life expectancy >3 months. Patients were treated with Endostar (rh-endostatin, YH-16), a recombinant endostatin product, in combination with vinorelbine and cisplatin (a standard chemotherapeutic regimen). The addition of Endostar to the standard chemotherapeutic regimen in these advanced NSCLC patients resulted in significant and clinically meaningful improvement in response rate, median time to progression, and clinical benefit rate compared with the chemotherapeutic regimen alone.

== Clinical significance ==
Endostatin may also be useful as a therapeutic for inflammatory diseases like rheumatoid arthritis as well as Crohn's disease, diabetic retinopathy, psoriasis, and endometriosis by reducing the infiltration of inflammatory cells through invading angiogenesis. Down syndrome patients seem to be protected from diabetic retinopathy due to an additional copy of chromosome 21, and elevated expression of endostatin.
