= George Lindsay Johnson =

British ophthalmologist

George Lindsay Johnson (10 July 1853 – 1 August 1943) was a British ophthalmologist.

Johnson was born in Manchester. He studied at Victoria University of Manchester (Owens College), Gonville and Caius College, Cambridge and St Bartholomew's Hospital. He obtained his M.D. in 1890 and F.R.C.S. in 1884. He worked at Royal Westminster Ophthalmic Hospital and Manchester Royal Eye Hospital. He published papers on mammalian, reptilian and amphibian eyes. He was also interested in photography.

He moved to South Africa in 1911. In his later life he became interested in psychical research and spiritualism.

== Publications ==
- Observations on the Macula Lutea: Histology of the Human Macula (1896)
- Photographic optics and Colour Photography (1909)
- A Pocket Atlas and Text-book of the Fundus Oculi: With Note and Drawing Book. Adlard, 1911.
- Photography in Colours (1916)
- Does Man Survive: The Great Problem of the Life Hereafter and the Evidence for Its Solution (1936)

Papers

- Johnson, George Lindsay. (1901). Contributions to the Comparative Anatomy of the Mammalian Eye, Chiefly Based on Ophthalmoscopic Examination. Philosophical Transactions of the Royal Society of London. Series B, Containing Papers of a Biological Character 194: 1-82.
- Johnson, George Lindsay. (1927). Contributions to the Comparative Anatomy of the Reptilian and the Amphibian Eye, Chiefly Based on Ophthalmological Examination. Philosophical Transactions of the Royal Society of London. Series B, Containing Papers of a Biological Character 215: 315-353.
- Johnson, George Lindsay (1968). "Ophthalmoscopic Studies on the Eyes of Mammals". Philosophical Transactions of the Royal Society of London. Series B, Biological Sciences. 254 (794): 207–220. ISSN 0080-4622.
  - This contains 50 out of the 160 plates that he collected for mammalian eye. He never published them in full during his lifetime, and they fell into private collections of by Dr A. Jokl of Johannesburg. 50 were published in the 1901 paper, and 50 of them were published here. The others remain unpublished.
  - However, the full set of paintings are available online as "Original illustrations of the mammalian eye by George Lindsay Johnson and Arthur William Head" at the Royal Society.
