= Type XVIII collagen =

Type of collagen

collagen, type XVIII, alpha 1

Identifiers
- Symbol: COL18A1
- NCBI gene: 80781
- HGNC: 2195
- OMIM: 120328
- RefSeq: NM_130445
- UniProt: P39060

Other data
- Locus: Chr. 21 q22.3
Search for
- Structures: Swiss-model
- Domains: InterPro

Type XVIII collagen is a type of collagen which can be cleaved to form endostatin. The endostatin is from the c terminus end of the collagen XVIII, and is known to have an inhibitory effect on the growth of blood vessels. This is seen with tumors, where endostatin inhibits the growth of the blood vessels of the tumor as well as the overall growth of the tumor.

The collagen XVIII is located within the basement membrane, and plays a major role in the integrity of the structure of the basement membrane for both endothelial and epithelial cells. The collagen XVIII has three different isoforms. While each of the isoforms has the same C-terminus end, they have a varying structure on the N-terminus end, which results in the formation of short, medium or long form Collagen XVIII.

== Knobloch syndrome ==
Knobloch syndrome is a type of inherited autosomal recessive disorder in which a mutation occurs in the endostatin COL18A1 protein encoding gene, which codes for production of type XVIII collagen. It is speculated that the mutation of type XVIII collagen that occurs in Knobloch syndrome can be located in several variants of endostatin, a gene that interacts with type XVIII collagen to not only develop the ocular system, but to also maintain its visual functionality. Evidence has been found for Knobloch syndrome development in genomes containing no mutations in the COL18A1 gene, and thus different variants of endostatin genes can also be responsible for the disease. One such variant of endostatin genes is the D1437N gene, which occurs after two mutations in the COL18A1 gene: the first is a one-base pair mutation insertion, and the other is an amino acid substitution of a conserved amino acid of endostatin. This amino acid substitution is deleterious because it blocks the endostatin variant from interacting with laminin. This discovery was significant in that it provided a new genetic locus for Knobloch syndrome, which helped to explain the development of the disease from genomes free of mutation in the COL18A1 gene.

The mutations in type XVIII collagen result in a multitude of abnormalities in vision and eye structure, some of which include high myopia, vitreoretinal degeneration, retinal detachment, macular abnormalities, and occipital encephalocele. Additionally, fragile iris, overgrowth of blood vessels in the retina, and an excess of electron-dense deposits, which leads to a disease called dense deposit disease, may also occur in Knobloch syndrome. Type XVIII collagen functions to provide strength, structural integrity, and cohesiveness to the basement membrane region in endothelial and epithelial cells of many different types of tissues. When type XVIII collagen is mutated at the COL18A1 gene, exon 2 in the sequence is skipped, which results in production of an early termination codon in exon 4 of this gene's transcript. This type of mutation particularly affects only one isoform of type XVIII collagen - the short isoform type, while the medium and long isoforms are unaffected.
