= Ophthalmoscopy =

Part of an eye examination

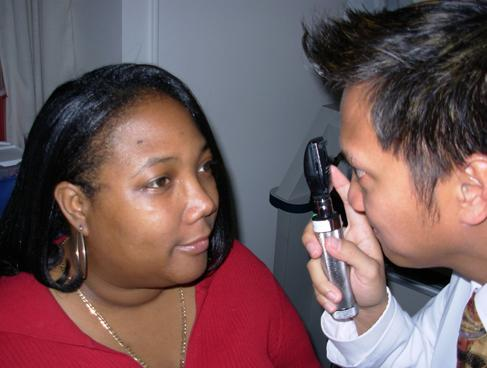
- Ophthalmoscopic exam: the medical provider would next move in and observe with the ophthalmoscope from a distance of one to several cm.
- MeSH: D009887

Ophthalmoscopy (from Ancient Greek ὀφθαλμός (ophthalmós), meaning "eye", and σκοπέω (skopéō), meaning "to look"), also called funduscopy, is a test that allows a health professional to see inside the fundus of the eye and other structures using an ophthalmoscope (or funduscope). It is done as part of an eye examination and may be done as part of a routine physical examination. It is crucial in determining the health of the retina, optic disc, and vitreous humor.

The pupil is a hole through which the eye's interior can be viewed. For better viewing, the pupil can be opened wider (dilated; mydriasis) before ophthalmoscopy using medicated eye drops (dilated fundus examination). However, undilated examination is more convenient (albeit not as comprehensive), and is the most common type in primary care.

An alternative or complement to ophthalmoscopy is to perform a fundus photography, where the image can be analysed later by a professional.

== Types ==
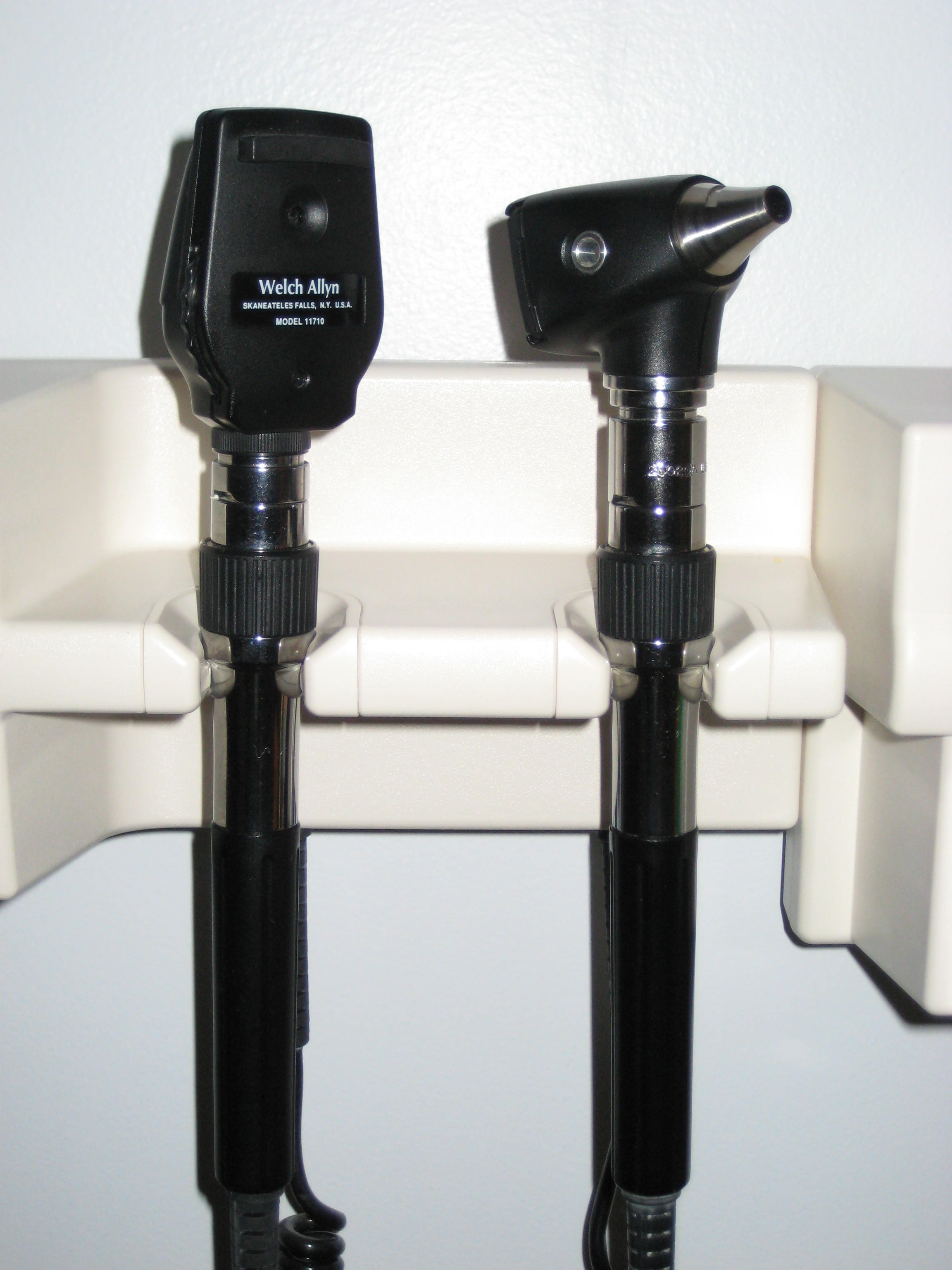
Ophthalmoscope (left) and otoscope combination by Welch Allyn

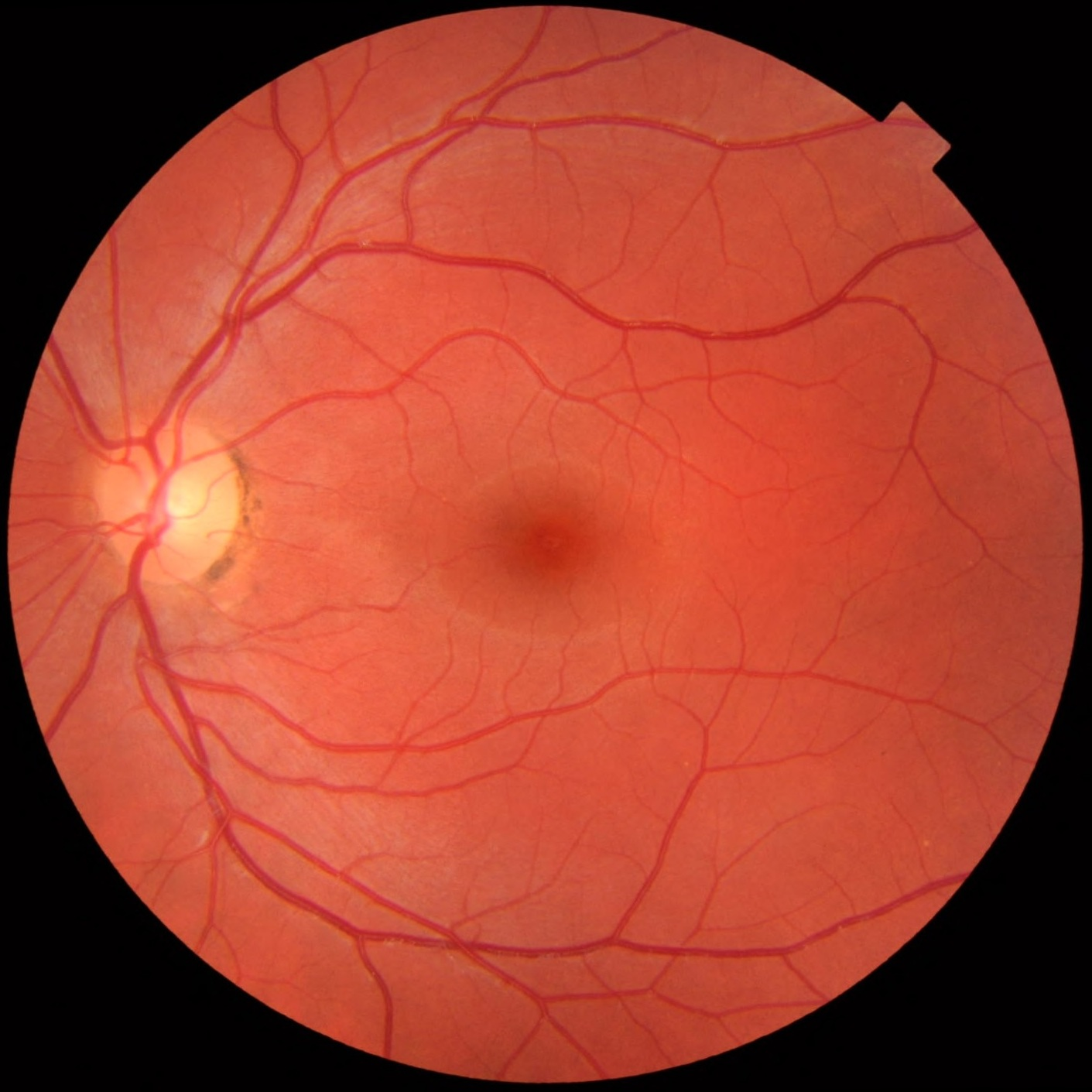
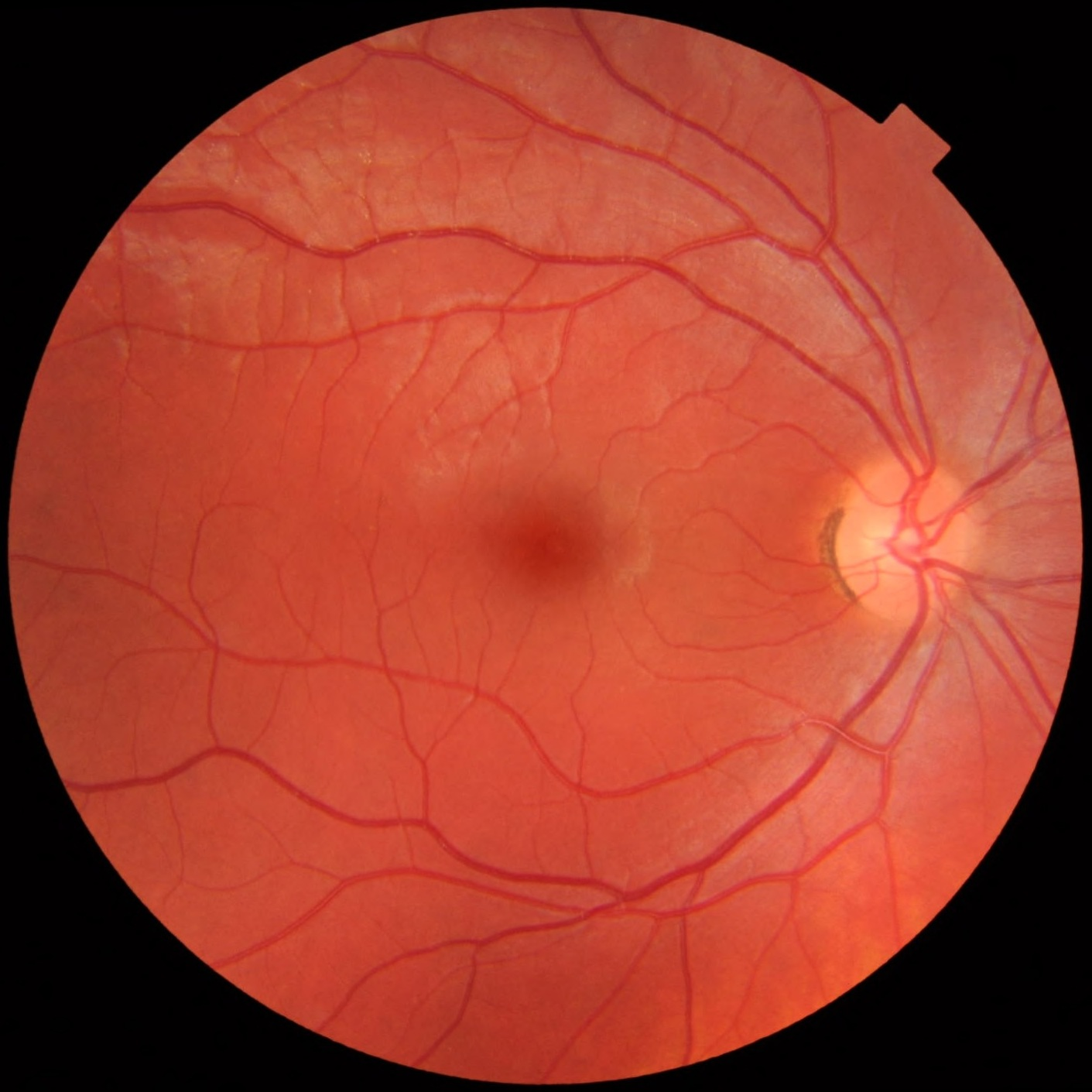
Fundus photographs of the left eye (left image) and right eye (right image). Each fundus has no sign of disease or pathology. The gaze is into the camera, so in each picture the macula is in the center of the image, and the optic disc is located towards the nose. Both optic discs have some pigmentation at the perimeter of the lateral side, which is considered non-pathological. The right image (right eye) shows lighter areas close to larger vessels, which has been regarded as a normal finding in younger people.

There are two major types of ophthalmoscopy:

- direct ophthalmoscopy, which produces an upright (unreversed) image of approximately 15× magnification
- indirect ophthalmoscopy, which produces an inverted (reversed) image of 2–5× magnification

Features	Direct ophthalmoscopy	Indirect ophthalmoscopy
Condensing lens	Not required	Required
Examination distance	As close to patient's eye as possible	At an arm's length
Image	Virtual, erect	Real, inverted
Illumination	Not as bright; not useful in hazy media	Bright; useful for hazy media
Area of field in focus	About 2–8 disc diameters	About 8 disc diameters
Stereopsis	Absent	Present
Accessible fundus view	Slightly beyond equator	Up to ora serrata, i.e. peripheral retina
Examination through hazy media	Difficult to impossible	Possible

Each type of ophthalmoscopy has a special type of ophthalmoscope:

- Direct ophthalmoscopy uses the direct ophthalmoscope, an instrument the size of a small flashlight with several lenses that can magnify up to about 15 times. This type of ophthalmoscope is most commonly used during a routine physical examination. The pan-ophthalmoscope has a larger primary lens with a variable focusing, allowing for a wider field-of-view.
- Indirect ophthalmoscopy uses the indirect ophthalmoscope, an instrument that has a light attached to a headband, in addition to a small handheld lens. It provides a wider view of the inside of the eye. Furthermore, it allows a better view of the fundus of the eye, even if the lens is clouded by cataracts. An indirect ophthalmoscope can be either monocular or binocular. It is used for peripheral viewing of the retina.

== Medical uses ==
Ophthalmoscopy is done as part of a routine physical or complete eye examination, mainly by optometrists and ophthalmologists. It is used to detect and evaluate symptoms of various retinal vascular diseases and eye diseases.

In patients with headaches, the finding of swollen optic discs (papilledema) on ophthalmoscopy is a key sign indicating raised intracranial pressure, which may be due to conditions such as hydrocephalus, benign intracranial hypertension (pseudotumor cerebri), and brain tumors. In glaucoma, cupped optic discs are seen. In patients with diabetes mellitus, regular ophthalmoscopic eye examinations (once every 6 months to 1 year) are important to screen for diabetic retinopathy, as visual loss due to diabetes can be prevented by retinal laser treatment if retinopathy is spotted early. In arterial hypertension, hypertensive changes of the retina closely mimic those in the brain and may predict cerebrovascular accidents (strokes).

== Dilating the pupil ==
During ophthalmoscopy, the pupil constricts due to light from the ophthalmoscope. To allow for better inspection of the posterior eye through the pupil, it is often desirable to dilate (enlarge) the pupil by applying a mydriatic agent (e.g. tropicamide), or by reducing the ophthalmoscope's brightness, which may slightly increase natural mydriasis.

Mydriatic agents are primarily considered ophthalmologist or optometrist equipment, but is used by other specialists as well, including neurologists and internists. Recent developments like scanning laser ophthalmoscopy can make good quality images through pupils as small as 2 mm (0.079 in), so dilating the pupil is not necessary with these methods.

== History ==
=== Early models ===
The first instrument for looking into the eye was first invented in 1847 by British inventor Charles Babbage. However, he was unable to obtain an image with the instrument when showing it to ophthalmologist Thomas Wharton Jones, and thus became discouraged to proceed further. The instrument is described by Jones as follows:

It consisted of a bit of plain mirror, with the silvering scraped off at two or three small spots in the middle, fixed within a tube at such an angle that the rays of light falling on it through an opening in the side of the tube, were reflected into the eye to be observed, and to which the one end of the tube was directed. The observer looked through the clear spots of the mirror from the other end.

— Thomas Wharton Jones, "Report on the Ophthalmoscope", Chronicle of Medical Science (October 1854)

Later in 1851, German physiologist Hermann von Helmholtz invented the ophthalmoscope again independently. At that time, Helmholtz was a young physiology professor and wanted to demonstrate to his students why the pupil was sometimes black and sometimes light. He wrote about his ophthalmoscope in detail and demonstrated that it required three essential components (which remain true today):

- a source of illumination (Helmholtz used a candle)
- a method of reflecting the light into the eye
- an optical method for correcting an unsharp image of the fundus

Helmholtz called his instrument an Augenspiegel ('eye mirror'). The name "ophthalmoscope" only came into common use in 1854, three years after the instrument's invention.

=== Later improvements ===
Helmholtz's first ophthalmoscope could not correct for refractive errors in the patient and/or the observer. This limitation was solved in 1852 by Helmholtz' machinist, Egbert Rekoss, who added two rotatable discs that each contained a few lenses. These wheels of lenses were superior to other early opthalmoscopes which used separate individual lenses that were inconvenient to change. The discs are known as the "Rekoss Disc" and continue to be used on most hand-held ophthalmoscopes today.

Observing the eye's interior required alignment of the observer's vision and the light source. This was discovered by William Cumming, a young ophthalmologist at the Royal London Ophthalmic Hospital, who wrote that "every eye could be made luminous if the axis from a source of illumination directed towards a person's eye and the line of vision of the observer were coincident". To eliminate this variable, some (including Lionel Beale) created ophthalmoscopes with an attached light source.

While training in France, Greek ophthalmologist Andreas Anagnostakis came up with the idea of making the instrument hand-held by adding a concave mirror. Austin Barnett created a model for Anagnostakis, which he used in his practice and subsequently presented at the first Ophthalmological Conference in Brussels in 1857, which made the instrument very popular among ophthalmologists.

The invention of the incandescent light bulb further enabled the ophthalmoscope to be self-luminous instead of relying on an external and remote source of illumination. The first ophthalmoscope to have an installed light bulb was created by William Dennet, who presented his invention to the American Ophthalmological Society in 1885, though it was unreliable as the light bulb's life was short and unpredictable.

The ophthalmoscope was further improved in 1915 by G.S. Crampton, who added a battery to the handle for powering the light source, thus making the instrument portable.

In 1915, Francis A. Welch and William Noah Allyn invented the world's first hand-held direct-illuminating ophthalmoscope. The company Welch Allyn started as a result of this invention. In the 2000s, the company developed a new design of ophthalmoscope called the "Panoptic". The instrument produced an image with a field-of-view five times larger than conventional direct ophthalmoscopes.

== Etymology and pronunciation ==
The word ophthalmoscopy (/ˌɒfθælˈmɒskəpi/) uses combining forms of ophthalmo- + -scopy, yielding "viewing the eye". The word funduscopy (/fʌnˈdʌskəpi/) derives from fundus + -scopy, yielding "viewing the far inside". The idea that fundus can and should correspond to a combining form fundo- drives the formation of an alternate form, fundoscopy (fundo- + -scopy), which is the subject of a descriptive-versus-prescriptive difference in acceptance. Some dictionaries enter the fundo- form as a second-listed variant, but others do not enter it at all, and one prescribes its avoidance with a usage note.

== See also ==
- Charles Schepens
- Retinoscope
- Scanning laser ophthalmoscopy
