= Intraretinal microvascular abnormalities =

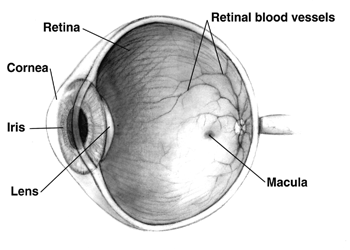
- Human eye cross-sectional/ retina view
- Specialty: Ophthalmology

Intraretinal microvascular abnormalities (IRMA) are abnormalities of the blood vessels that supply the retina of the eye, a sign of diabetic retinopathy. IRMA can be difficult to distinguish from and is likely a precursor to retinal neovascularization. One way to distinguish IRMA from retinal neovascularization is to perform fluorescein angiography. Since IRMA blood vessels are patent, unlike neovascular vessels, they do not leak, and therefore exhibit hyperfluorescence on fluorescein angiography.

IRMA is deeper in the retina than neovascularization, has blurrier edges, is more of a burgundy than a red, does not appear on the optic disc, and is usually seen after a shorter period of poorly controlled diabetes than neovascularization.
