= Diabetic retinopathy =

Diabetes-induced damage to the retina of the eye

- Other names: Diabetic eye disease
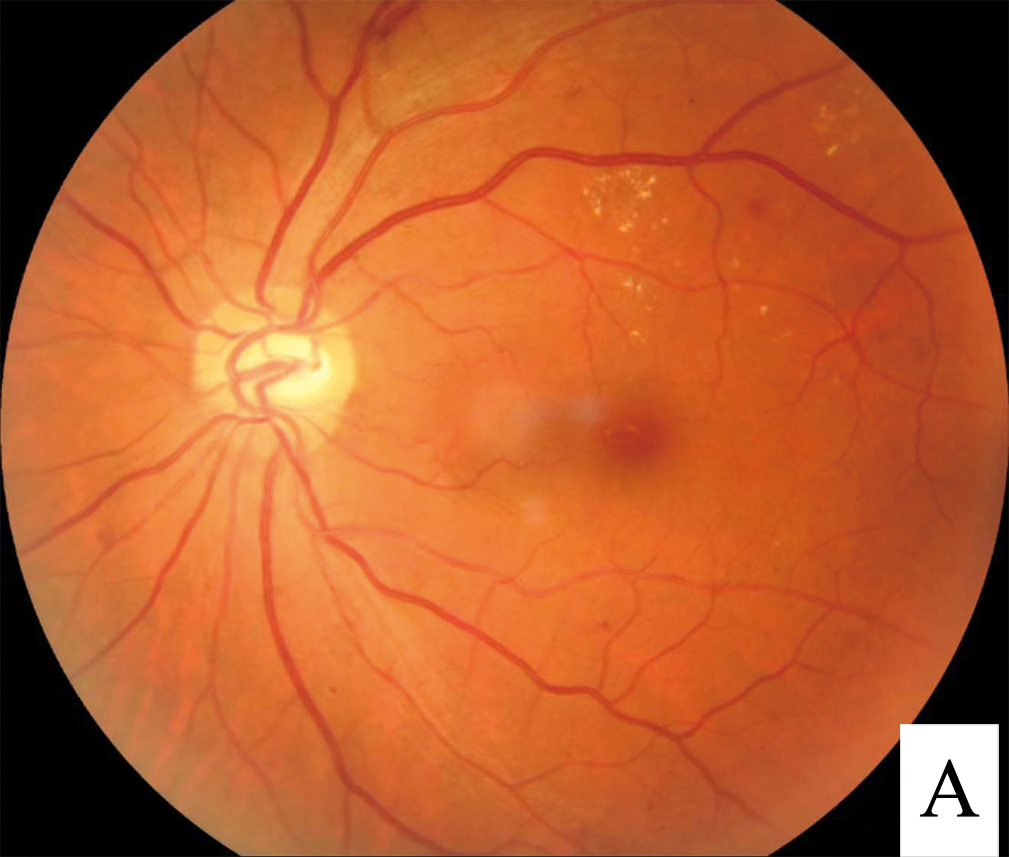
- Fundus image, showing several common signs of diabetic retinopathy
- Pronunciation: ˌrɛtɪnˈɑpəθi
- Specialty: Ophthalmology, optometry
- Symptoms: Often asymptomatic, but can cause spots in the eye and vision loss.
- Complications: Vitreous hemorrhage, Retinal detachment, Glaucoma, Blindness
- Duration: Lifelong
- Causes: Long-term poor control of diabetes mellitus
- Risk factors: Diabetes, poor control of blood sugar, smoking, inflammation
- Diagnostic method: Eye examination
- Treatment: Laser coagulation, Vitrectomy
- Medication: Anti-VEGF Injection
- Frequency: Nearly all patients with type 1 diabetes and >60% of patients with type 2 diabetes

Diabetic retinopathy (also known as diabetic eye disease) is a medical condition in which damage occurs to the retina due to diabetes. It is a leading cause of blindness in developed countries and one of the leading causes of sight loss in the world, even though there are many new therapies and improved treatments for helping people living with diabetes.

Diabetic retinopathy affects up to 80 percent of those who have had both type 1 and type 2 diabetes for 20 years or more. In at least 90% of new cases, progression to more aggressive forms of sight-threatening retinopathy and maculopathy could be reduced with proper treatment and monitoring of the eyes. The longer a person has diabetes, the higher their chances of developing diabetic retinopathy. Each year in the United States, diabetic retinopathy accounts for 12% of all new cases of blindness. It is also the leading cause of blindness in people aged 20 to 64.

== Signs and symptoms ==
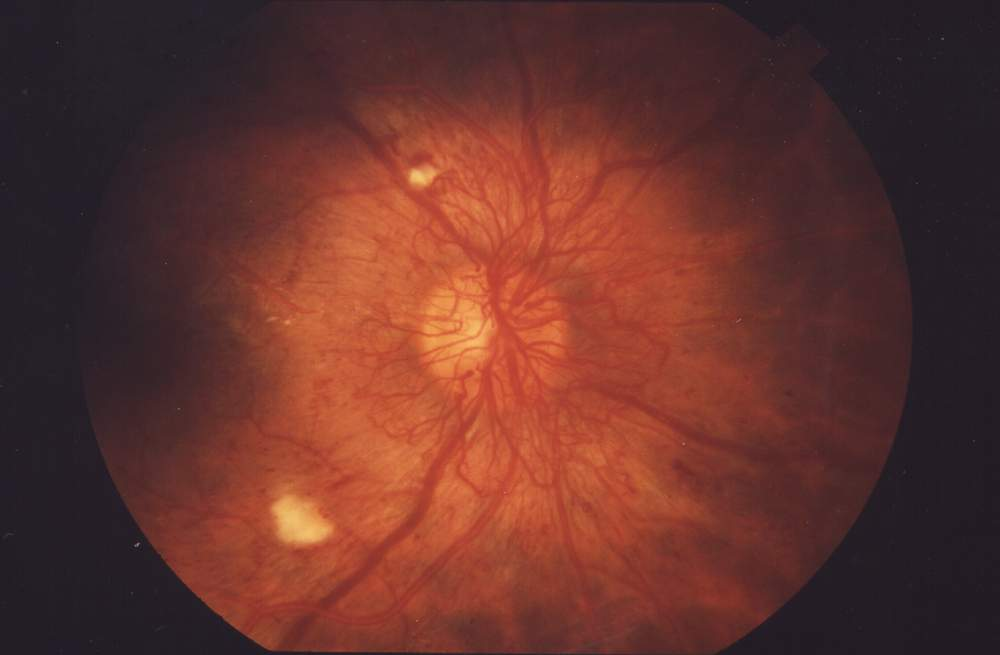
Proliferative diabetic retinopathy

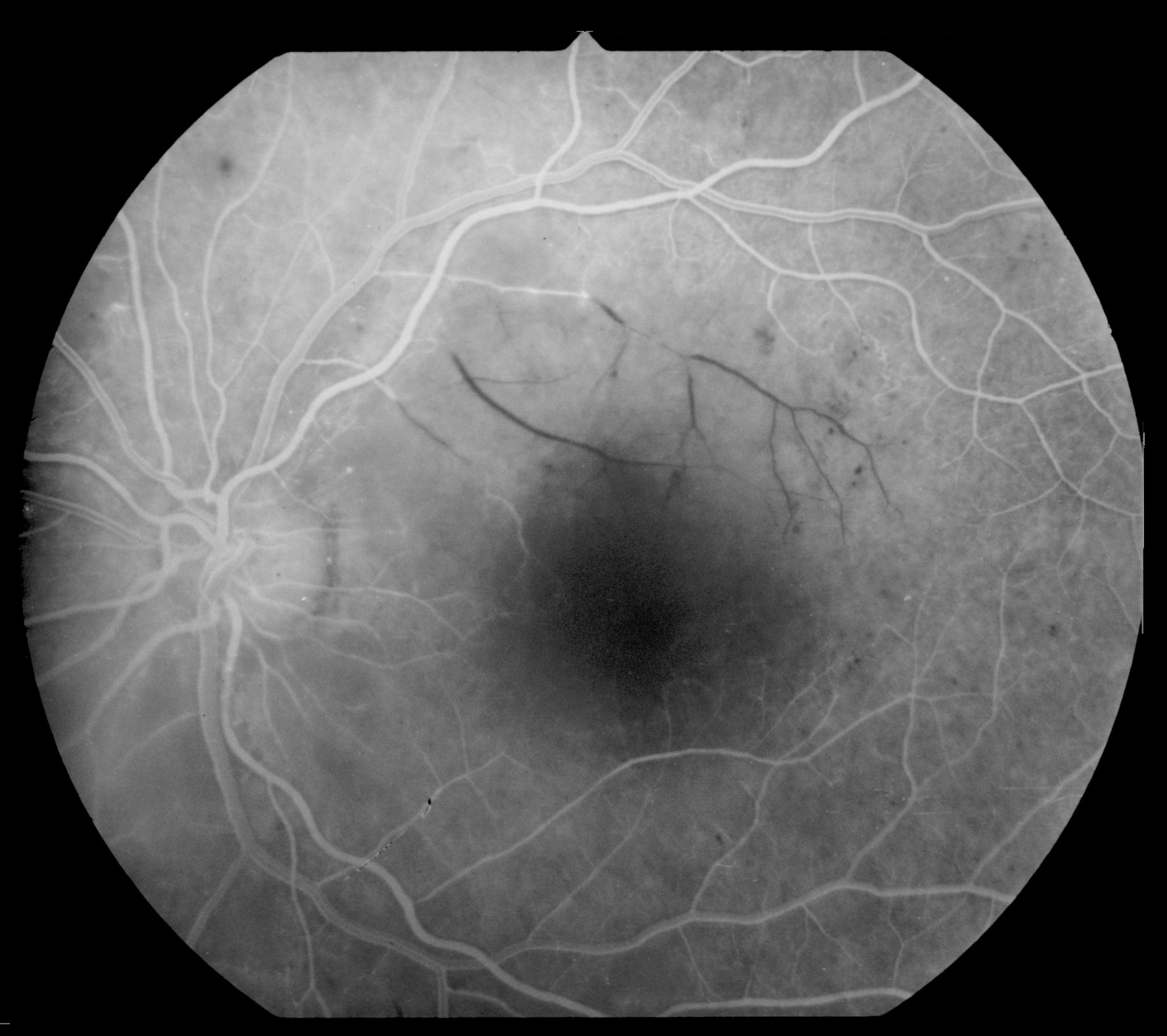
Emptied retinal venules due to arterial branch occlusion in diabetic retinopathy (fluorescein angiography)

Nearly all people with diabetes develop some degree of retina damage ("retinopathy") over several decades with the disease. For many, that damage can only be detected by a retinal exam, and has no noticeable effect on vision. Over time, progressive retinal damage may appear on a retinal exam, first with small bulges in retinal blood vessels called microaneurysms. Then larger abnormalities in retinal vessels: cotton wool spots, hemorrhages, lipid deposits called "hard exudates", intraretinal microvascular abnormalities, and abnormal-looking retinal veins. Eventually, many progress to a stage called "proliferative retinopathy", where new blood vessels grow throughout the retina. These new blood vessels often break and bleed. Minor bleeding can cause dark floating spots obstructing vision; major bleeding can completely block vision.

Around half of people with diabetic retinopathy develop swelling of the macula, called macular edema, which can begin at any time. If the swelling occurs near the center of the macula, it can cause vision disruptions ranging from mildly blurred vision to severe loss of the center of an affected person's visual field. Left untreated, around 30% of those with such swelling experience vision disruption over the next 3–5 years. Macular edema is the most common cause of vision loss in people with diabetic retinopathy.

The repeated processes of blood vessel growth, swelling, and scarring can eventually cause retinal detachment, which manifests as the sudden appearance of dark floating spots, flashes of light, or blurred vision.

== Causes ==
Diabetic retinopathy is caused by prolonged high blood glucose damaging the small blood vessels of the retina, though the mechanism by which this occurs is unknown. Progression of diabetic retinopathy is accompanied by loss of capillary cells, increased blood vessel permeability in the retina, and altered retinal blood flow, all of which can reduce the amount of blood oxygen that gets delivered to the retina. Poor oxygenation of tissues drives the formation of new blood vessels throughout the retina, resulting in the proliferative stage of disease. These new blood vessels tend to rupture easily, causing bleeding within the eye, scarring, and damage to the retina or macula.

=== Risk factors ===
The major risk factors for developing diabetic retinopathy are duration of diabetes, poor blood sugar control, and, to a lesser extent, high blood pressure. Five years after diabetes diagnosis, around 25% of those with type 1 diabetes have some degree of diabetic retinopathy, while 2% have proliferative diabetic retinopathy. By 15 years after diagnosis, that increases to 80% with some retinopathy, and 25% with proliferative disease. Children are an exception—regardless of duration of diabetes, children rarely experience sight-threatening retinopathy; however, puberty can accelerate retinopathy progression. Pregnancy can also accelerate the progression of diabetic retinopathy (although women with gestational diabetes are not at risk).

Both chronically high blood sugar (measured by a high HbA1c) and highly variable blood sugar are associated with developing diabetic retinopathy. Several more minor risk factors also exacerbate diabetic retinopathy, namely, kidney disease, abnormal blood lipids, high body mass index, and smoking.

Genetic predisposition to diabetic retinopathy in type 2 diabetes consists of many genetic variants across the genome that are collectively associated with diabetic retinopathy (polygenic risk) and overlaps with genetic risk for glucose, low-density lipoprotein cholesterol, and systolic blood pressure. Several variations in the VEGFC gene have also been associated with an increased risk of developing macular edema.

People with Down syndrome, who have extra chromosome 21 material, rarely acquire diabetic retinopathy. This protection appears to be due to the elevated levels of endostatin, an anti-angiogenic protein, derived from collagen XVIII. The collagen XVIII gene is located on chromosome 21.

Incidence of Retinitis Pigmentosa is observed to result in fewer and less severe microvascular lesions in both humans and mouse models. Retinitis Pigmentosa results in loss of rod receptors in the mid peripheral field, reducing the oxygen consumption that is linked with release of VEGF and growth of unwanted blood vessels in the retina.

Obstructive sleep apnea (OSA) has been associated with a higher incidence of diabetic eye disease due to blood desaturation caused by intermittent upper airway obstructions. Treatment for OSA can help reduce the risk of diabetic complications.

== Pathogenesis ==
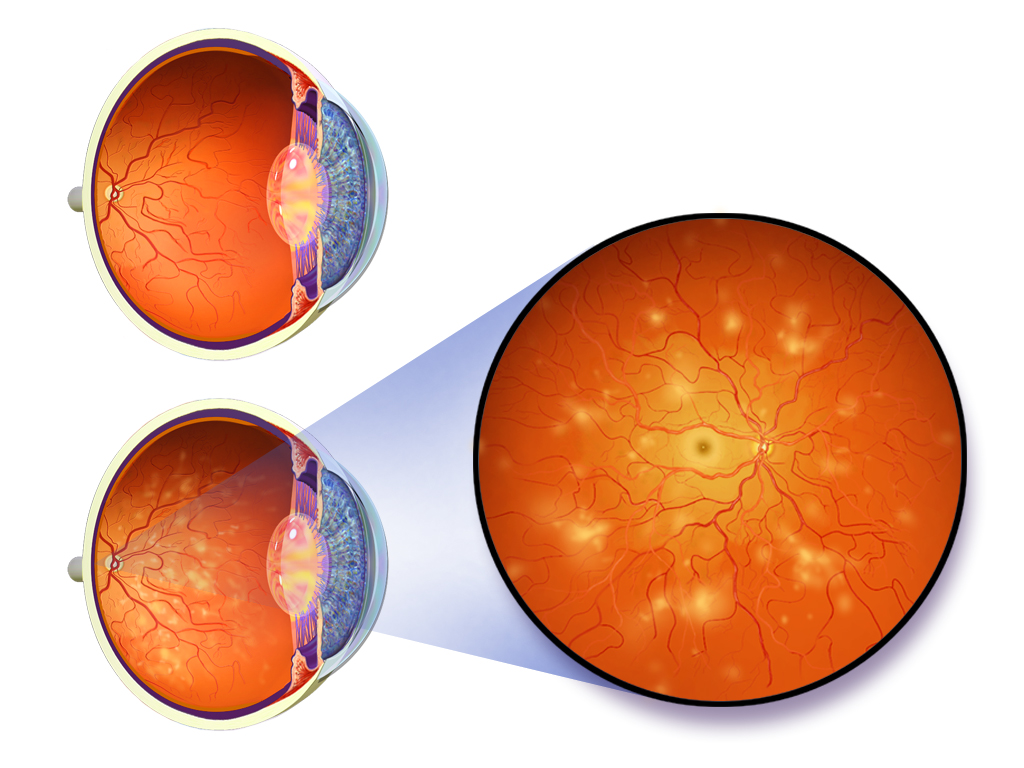
Illustration depicting diabetic retinopathy

Diabetic retinopathy is the result of damage to the small blood vessels and neurons of the retina. The earliest changes leading to diabetic retinopathy include narrowing of the retinal arteries associated with reduced retinal blood flow; dysfunction of the neurons of the inner retina, followed in later stages by changes in the function of the outer retina, associated with subtle changes in visual function; dysfunction of the blood-retinal barrier, which protects the retina from many substances in the blood (including toxins and immune cells), leading to the leaking of blood constituents into the retinal neuropile. Later, the basement membrane of the retinal blood vessels thickens, capillaries degenerate and lose cells, particularly pericytes and vascular smooth muscle cells. This leads to loss of blood flow and progressive ischemia, and microscopic aneurysms which appear as balloon-like structures jutting out from the capillary walls, which recruit inflammatory cells; and advanced dysfunction and degeneration of the neurons and glial cells of the retina. The condition typically develops about 10–15 years after receiving the diagnosis of diabetes mellitus.

An experimental study suggests that pericyte death is caused by blood glucose persistently activating protein kinase C and mitogen-activated protein kinase (MAPK), which, through a series of intermediates, inhibits signaling through platelet-derived growth factor receptors—signaling that supports cellular survival, proliferation, and growth. The resulting withdrawal of this signaling leads to the programmed cell death (apoptosis) of the cells in this experimental model.

In addition, excessive sorbitol in diabetics is deposited in the retina tissue, and it is also proposed to play a role in diabetic retinopathy.

Recent studies have found a strong correlation between retinal inflammation and diabetic retinopathy progression.

A genetic study showed that diabetic retinopathy shares a similar genetic predisposition with levels of glucose, low-density lipoprotein cholesterol, and systolic blood pressure, indicating that glycemic control and cardiometabolic factors may be important in the development of diabetic retinopathy.

Lipid peroxidation plays a notable role in the progression of diabetic retinopathy. Free radicals such as hydroxyl and hydroperoxyl species with oxygen as functional group oxidize lipids and phospholipids, and at the cellular level bring about membrane lipid peroxidation and in this way can trigger diabetic retinopathy.

The diabetic macular edema manifestation is difficult to predict. Autoantibodies against hexokinase 1 are commonly associated with diabetic macular edema manifestation. Nearly one-third of patients with diabetic macular edema were found to be positive for anti-hexokinase 1 autoantibodies. Importantly, these autoantibodies were rare in patients with diabetic retinopathy only or diabetes mellitus only. However, these autoantibodies fail to predict disease onset. They likely manifest secondary to the tissue-damaging stimulus at diabetic macular edema onset and cannot be used to predict diabetic macular edema before its onset.

== Diagnosis ==
Diabetic retinopathy is typically diagnosed by retinal exam observations using ophthalmoscopy. The American Academy of Ophthalmology divides diabetic retinopathy into five categories of progressive severity. The first category, "no apparent retinopathy", describes those with a healthy retinal exam. The next three categories: mild, moderate, and severe nonproliferative diabetic retinopathy (NPDR), describe increasing levels of damage to the retina. People with mild NPDR have microaneurysms in the retina, but no other damage. Those with severe NPDR have 20+ retinal hemorrhages in each quadrant of the retina, a distinctive pattern of damage on the veins of the retina called "venous beading" in at least two retinal quadrants, and obvious intraretinal microvascular abnormalities anywhere on the retina. Moderate NPDR is defined as more severe than mild NPDR, but not yet meeting the criteria for severe NPDR. The fifth stage, proliferative diabetic retinopathy, is for those with new blood vessels forming throughout the retina ("retinal neovascularization"), or blood leaking into the vitreous humor ("vitreous hemorrhage") or between the vitreous membrane and retina ("preretinal hemorrhage").

The same guidelines separately categorize macular edema into two categories: "macular edema apparently absent" and "macular edema apparently present." The latter is further subdivided into "mild"—retinal thickening or lipid deposits far from the macula's center; "moderate"— thickening or deposits near the center; and "severe"—thickening or deposits on the macula center. Optical coherence tomography is frequently used to assess macular edema.

Fluorescein angiography is used by retina specialists to assess diabetic retinopathy severity further and to determine sites of macular damage.

Electroretinography or ERGs, especially when combined with the pupillary response, can be used to predict which patients are likely to progress to having treatable disease.

=== Screening ===
Due to the lack of symptoms, most people with diabetic retinopathy are unaware that they have the condition until they visit an eye doctor. Both the American Diabetes Association (ADA) and the International Council of Ophthalmology (ICO) recommend regular eye exams for those with diabetes to screen for diabetic retinopathy (except those with gestational diabetes). The ADA recommends a comprehensive eye examination at the time of type 2 diabetes diagnosis, and within five years of the onset of type 1 diabetes. For women with diabetes who become pregnant, the ADA recommends an eye examination before pregnancy, in each trimester, and for a year postpartum. The ICO recommends eye examinations for those with diabetes include a visual acuity examination and a retinal examination via ophthalmoscopy or retinal photography.

Iceland, Ireland, and the United Kingdom are the only countries with national diabetic retinopathy screening programs, while substantial regional screening programs have been implemented in parts of mainland Europe, parts of Asia, and Botswana.

== Management ==
There are four common treatments for diabetic retinopathy: anti-VEGF injections, steroid injections, panretinal laser photocoagulation, and vitrectomy. Current treatment regimens can prevent 90% of severe vision loss.

Although these treatments are very successful (in slowing or stopping further vision loss), they do not cure diabetic retinopathy. Caution should be exercised in treatment with laser surgery since it causes a loss of retinal tissue. It is often more prudent to inject triamcinolone or anti-VEGF drugs. In some patients, it results in a marked increase in vision, especially if there is an edema of the macula.

In addition, standard treatment for diabetic retinopathy includes improving control of blood sugar, blood pressure, and blood cholesterol, all of which can reduce diabetic retinopathy progression.

=== Mild or moderate NPDR ===
For those with mild to moderate non-proliferative diabetic retinopathy, the American Academy of Ophthalmology recommends only more frequent retinal exams—every six to twelve months—as these people are at an increased risk of developing proliferative retinopathy or macular edema. Injection of anti-VEGF drugs or steroids can reduce diabetic retinopathy progression in around half of eyes treated; however, whether this results in improved vision long term is not yet known. The lipid-lowering drug fenofibrate also reduces progression of disease in people with mild to moderate disease.

=== Diabetic macular edema ===
Those at highest risk of vision loss – that is, with edema near the center of the macula – benefit most from eye injections of anti-VEGF therapies aflibercept, bevacizumab, or ranibizumab. There is no widely accepted dosing schedule, though people typically receive more frequent injections during the first year of treatment, with less frequent injections in subsequent years sufficient to maintain remission. Those whose eyes don't improve with anti-VEGF therapy may instead receive laser photocoagulation, typically in the form of short laser pulses. Those with macular edema but no vision loss do not benefit from treatment; the American Academy of Ophthalmology recommends deferring treatment until visual acuity falls to at least 20/30.

=== Laser photocoagulation ===
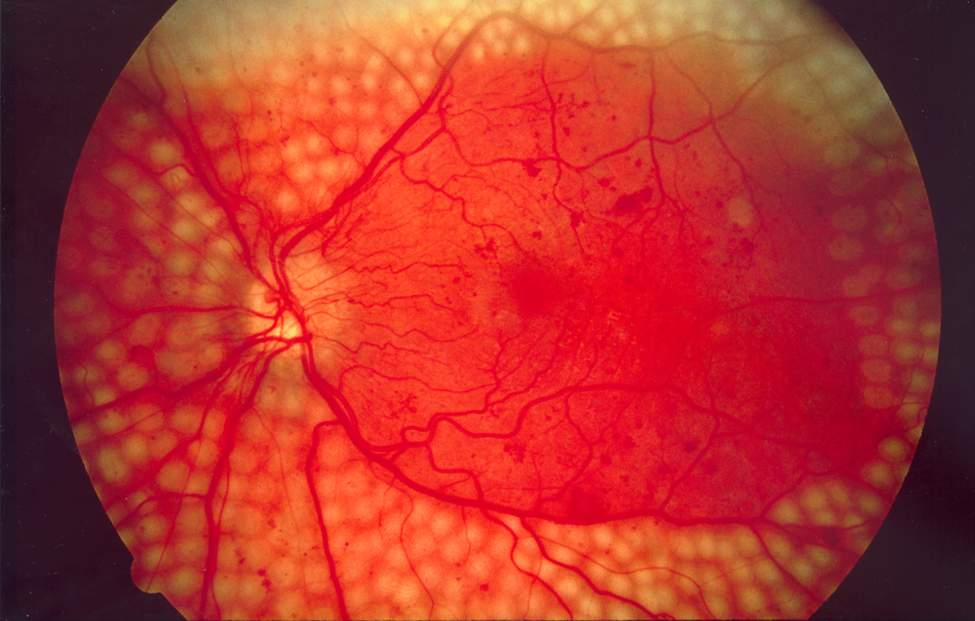
Image of fundus showing scatter laser surgery for diabetic retinopathy

Laser photocoagulation can be used in two scenarios for the treatment of diabetic retinopathy. Firstly, to treat macular edema and secondly, for treating the whole retina (panretinal photocoagulation) for controlling neovascularization. It is widely used for the early stages of proliferative retinopathy. There are different types of lasers, and there is evidence available on their benefits to treat proliferative diabetic retinopathy.

==== Panretinal laser photocoagulation ====
For those with proliferative or severe non-proliferative diabetic retinopathy, vision loss can be prevented by treatment with panretinal laser photocoagulation.

The goal is to create 1,600–2,000 burns in the retina with the hope of reducing the retina's oxygen demand, and hence the possibility of ischemia. It is done in multiple sittings.

In treating advanced diabetic retinopathy, the burns are used to destroy the abnormal new blood vessels that form in the retina. This has been shown to reduce the risk of severe vision loss for eyes at risk by 50%.

Before using the laser, the ophthalmologist dilates the pupil and applies anaesthetic drops to numb the eye. In some cases, the doctor may also numb the area behind the eye to reduce discomfort. The patient sits facing the laser machine while the doctor holds a special lens on the eye. The physician can use a single spot laser, a pattern scan laser for two-dimensional patterns such as squares, rings, and arcs, or a navigated laser, which works by tracking retinal eye movements in real time. During the procedure, the patient will see flashes of light. These flashes often create an uncomfortable stinging sensation for the patient. After the laser treatment, patients should be advised not to drive for a few hours while the pupils are still dilated. Vision will most likely remain blurry for the rest of the day. Though there should not be much pain in the eye itself, an ice-cream headache like pain may last for hours afterwards.

Patients will lose some of their peripheral vision after this surgery, although it may be barely noticeable by the patient. The procedure does, however, save the center of the patient's sight. Laser surgery may also slightly reduce colour and night vision.

A person with proliferative retinopathy will always be at risk for new bleeding, as well as glaucoma, a complication from the new blood vessels. This means that multiple treatments may be required to protect vision.

=== Medications ===
==== Intravitreal triamcinolone acetonide ====
Triamcinolone is a long-acting steroid preparation. Treating people with DME with intravitreal injections of triamcinolone may lead to some degree of improvement in visual acuity when compared to eyes treated with placebo injections. When injected in the vitreous cavity, the steroid decreases the macular edema (thickening of the retina at the macula) caused by diabetic maculopathy, and that may increase visual acuity. The effect of triamcinolone is not permanent and may last up to three months, which necessitates repeated injections for maintaining the beneficial effect. Best results of intravitreal Triamcinolone have been found in eyes that have already undergone cataract surgery. Complications of intravitreal injection of triamcinolone may include cataract, steroid-induced glaucoma, and endophthalmitis.

==== Intravitreal anti-VEGF ====
Aflibercept may have advantages in improving visual outcomes over bevacizumab and ranibizumab, after one year, longer-term advantages are unclear In cases with vitreous hemorrhage, however, anti-VEGF injections proved to be less effective in restoring visual acuity than vitrectomy combined with panretinal laser-photocoagulation.

==== Other ====
Fenofibrate, a drug that is also used to reduce cholesterol levels, has been studied for its role in helping to improve the negative effects caused by diabetes and reducing the occurrence of retinal inflammation. There is some evidence that overall, in people with type II diabetes, fenofibrate may not make a clinically significant difference in progression of DME. For people who have type II diabetes and have overt retinopathy, there is evidence that fenofibrate may be more effective at reducing the progression of retinal damage.

=== Surgery ===
Instead of laser surgery, some people require a vitrectomy to restore vision. A vitrectomy is performed when there is a lot of blood in the vitreous. It involves removing the cloudy vitreous and replacing it with a saline solution.

Studies show that people who have a vitrectomy soon after a large hemorrhage are more likely to protect their vision than someone who waits to have the operation. Early vitrectomy is especially effective in people with insulin-dependent diabetes, who may be at greater risk of blindness from a hemorrhage into the eye.

Vitrectomy may be done under general or local anesthesia. The doctor makes a tiny incision in the sclera, or white of the eye. Next, a small instrument is placed into the eye to remove the vitreous and insert the saline solution into the eye.

Patients may be able to return home soon after the vitrectomy, or may be asked to stay in the hospital overnight. After the operation, the eye will be red and sensitive, and patients usually need to wear an eyepatch for a few days or weeks to protect the eye. Medicated eye drops are also prescribed to protect against infection. There is evidence which suggests anti-VEGF drugs given either before or during vitrectomy may reduce the risk of posterior vitreous cavity haemorrhage . Vitrectomy is frequently combined with other modalities of treatment.

== Epidemiology ==
Around 35% of people with diabetes have diabetic retinopathy; around 10% experience some degree of vision loss. Diabetic retinopathy is particularly common in those with type 1 diabetes, affecting 25% of people five years from diagnosis, 60% 10 years from diagnosis, and 80% 15 years from diagnosis. Chances of disease progression are heavily influenced by blood sugar control, but on average 7% of those with diabetes experiencing proliferative diabetic retinopathy and 7% diabetic macular edema. Diabetic retinopathy is the leading cause of vision loss in those 20–74 years old.

The global burden of diabetic retinopathy increased dramatically from 1990 to 2015—from 1.4 million to 2.6 million people with visual impairment; from 0.2 million to 0.4 million blinded—due in large part to the increasing burden of type 2 diabetes in low- and middle-income countries.

== Research ==
Several large multicenter randomized clinical trials have been done to evaluate treatment protocols for those with diabetic retinopathy, namely the Early Treatment for Diabetic Retinopathy Study, Diabetic Retinopathy Vitrectomy Study, Diabetic Retinopathy Study, Diabetes Control and Complications Trial, UK Prospective Diabetes Study, and the Diabetic Retinopathy Clinical Research Network Protocols I, S, and T.

=== Light treatment ===
A medical device comprising a mask that delivers green light through the eyelids while a person sleeps was under development in 2016. The light from the mask stops rod cells in the retina from dark adapting, which is thought to reduce their oxygen requirement, which in turn diminishes new blood vessel formation and thus prevents diabetic retinopathy. As of 2016, a large clinical trial was underway. As of 2018, the results from the clinical trial showed no long-term therapeutic benefit from using the mask in diabetic retinopathy patients.

=== C-peptide ===
C-peptide had shown promising results in the treatment of diabetic complications incidental to vascular degeneration. Creative Peptides, Eli Lilly, and Cebix all had drug development programs for a C-peptide product. Cebix had the only ongoing program until it completed a Phase IIb trial in December 2014 that showed no difference between C-peptide and placebo, and it terminated its program and went out of business.

=== Stem cell therapy ===
Clinical trials are underway or are being populated in preparation for study at medical centers in Brazil, Iran, and the United States. Current trials involve using the patients' own stem cells derived from bone marrow and injected into the degenerated areas to regenerate the vascular system.

=== Blood pressure control ===
A Cochrane review examined 29 randomized controlled trials to determine whether interventions that sought to control or reduce blood pressure in diabetics had any effects on diabetic retinopathy. While the results showed that interventions to control or reduce blood pressure prevented diabetic retinopathy for up to 4–5 years in diabetics, there was no evidence of any effect of these interventions on progression of diabetic retinopathy, preservation of visual acuity, adverse events, quality of life, and costs.

=== Fundoscopic image analyses ===
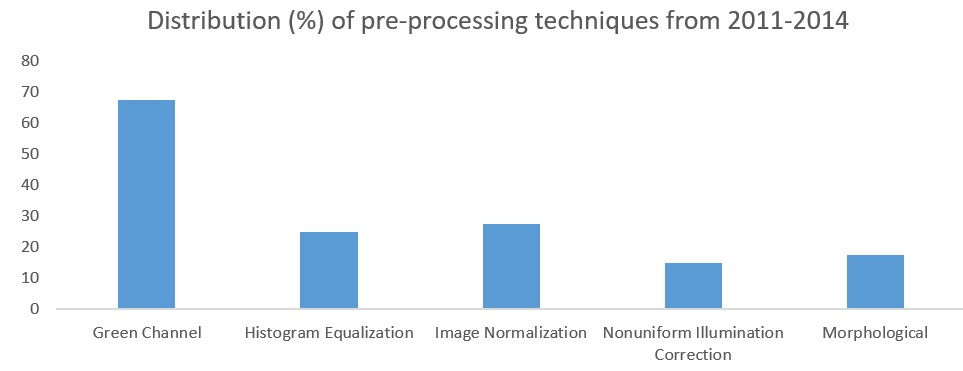
Distribution in percentage of pre-processing techniques from 2011 to 2014

Diabetic retinopathy is diagnosed entirely by recognizing abnormalities on retinal images taken by fundoscopy. Color fundus photography is mainly used for staging the disease. Fluorescein angiography is used to assess the extent of retinopathy, which aids in treatment plan development. Optical coherence tomography (OCT) is used to determine the severity of edema and treatment response.

Because fundoscopic images are the main sources for the diagnosis of diabetic retinopathy, manually analyzing those images can be time-consuming and unreliable, as the ability to detect abnormalities varies by years of experience. Therefore, scientists have explored developing computer-aided diagnosis approaches to automate the process, which involves extracting information about the blood vessels and any abnormal patterns from the rest of the fundoscopic image and analyzing them.

== See also ==
- Diabetic diet
- Diabetic papillopathy
- Purtscher's retinopathy, a disease with similar abnormalities in the eye, usually caused by trauma.
- Retinal regeneration
