= Fundus (eye) =

Concave interior of the eye

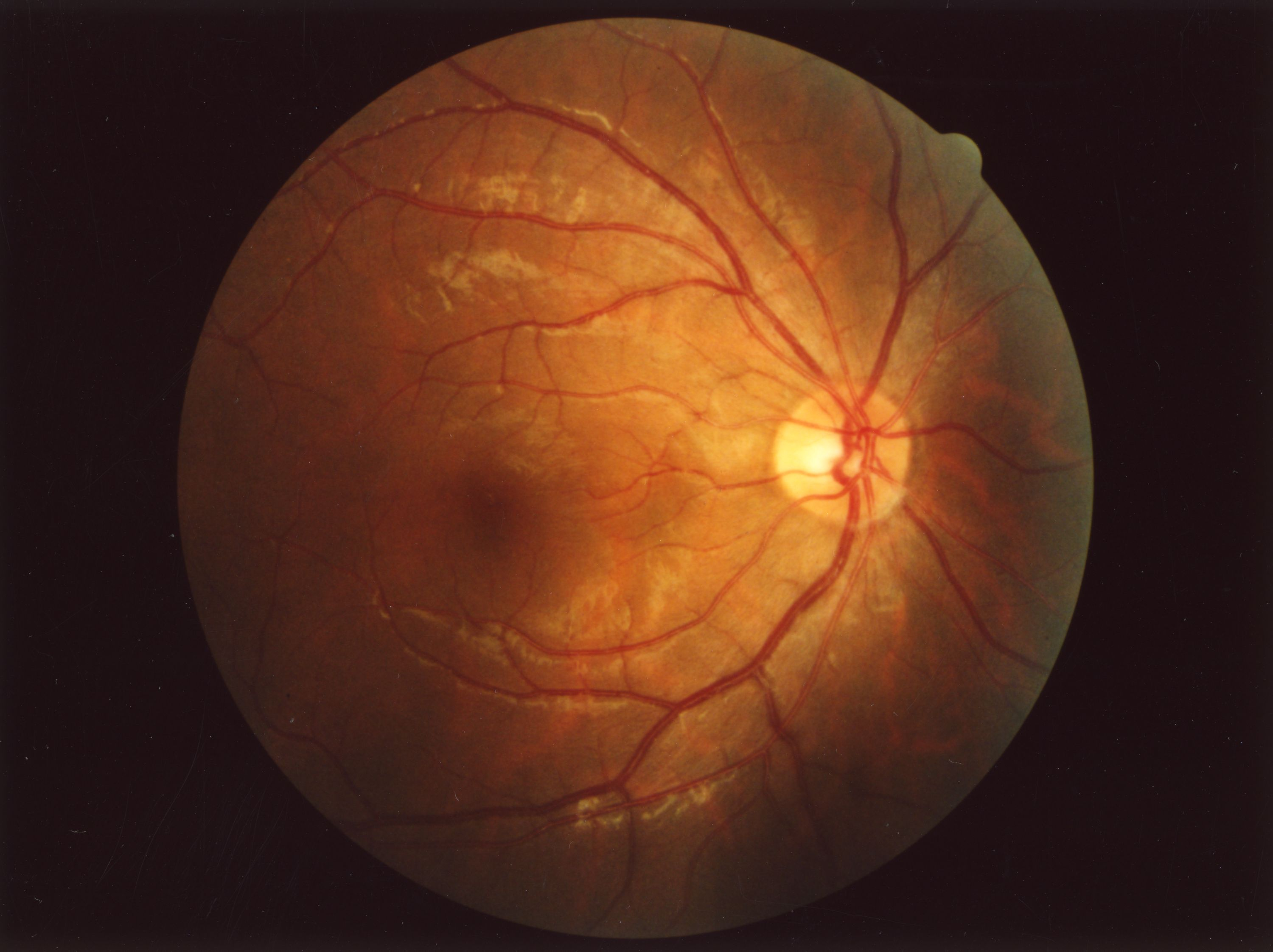
- Fundus of human eye

Identifiers
- MeSH: D005654

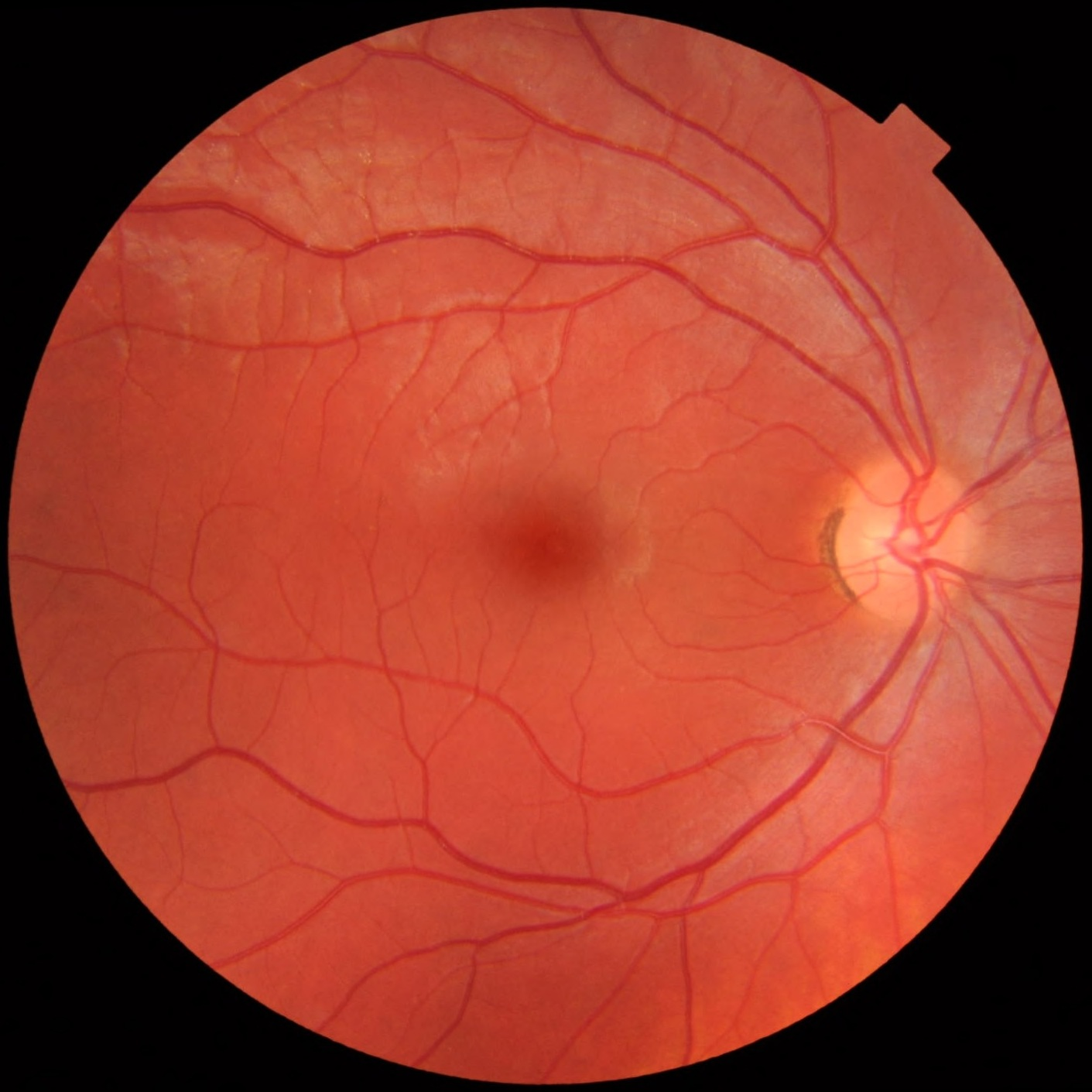
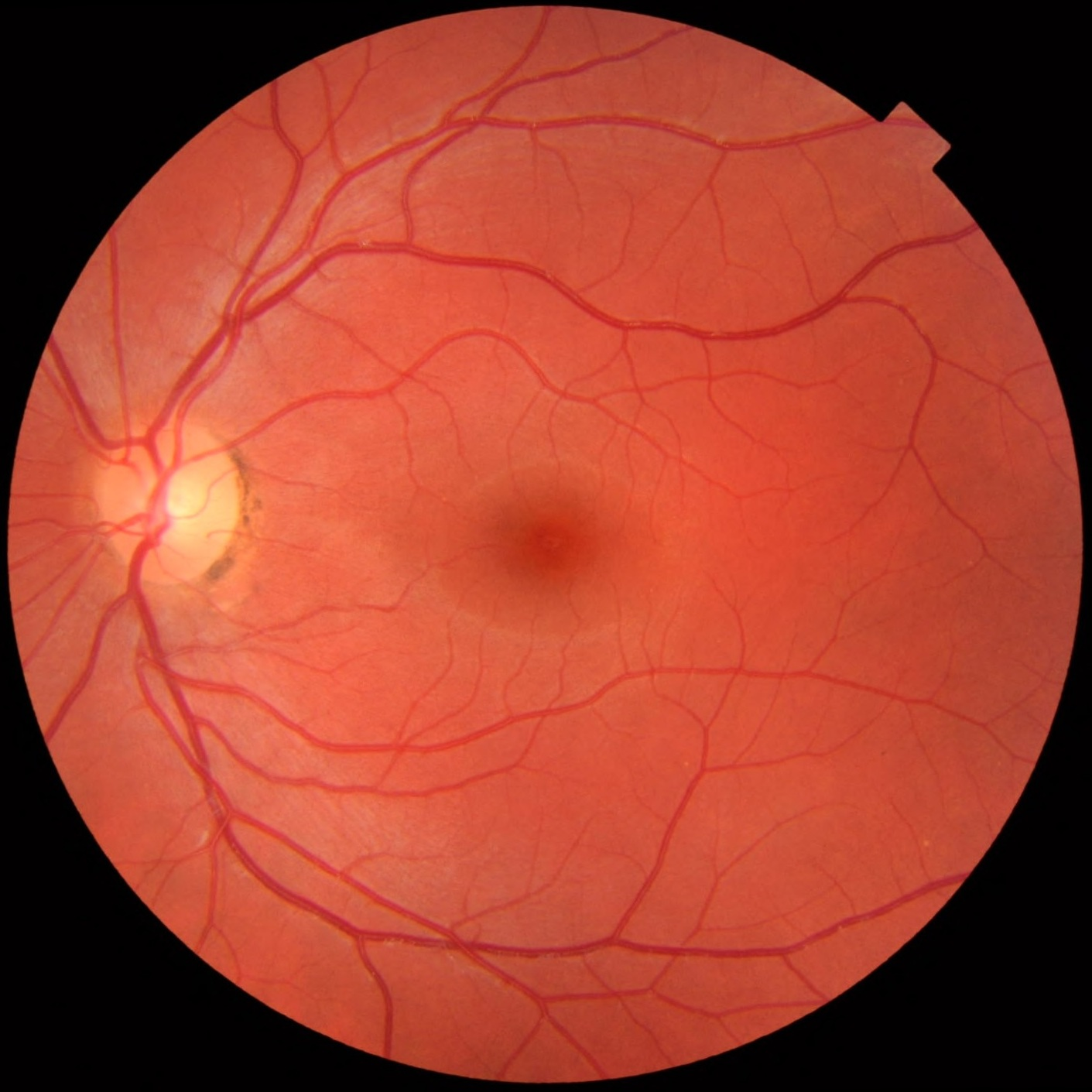
Fundus photographs of the right eye (left image) and left eye (right image), as seen from the front (as if face to face with the viewer).

Each fundus has no sign of disease or pathology. The gaze is into the camera, so in each picture the macula is in the center of the image, and the optic disc is located towards the nose. Both optic discs have some pigmentation at the perimeter of the lateral side, which is considered non-pathological.

The left image (right eye) shows lighter areas close to larger vessels, which has been regarded as a normal finding in younger people.

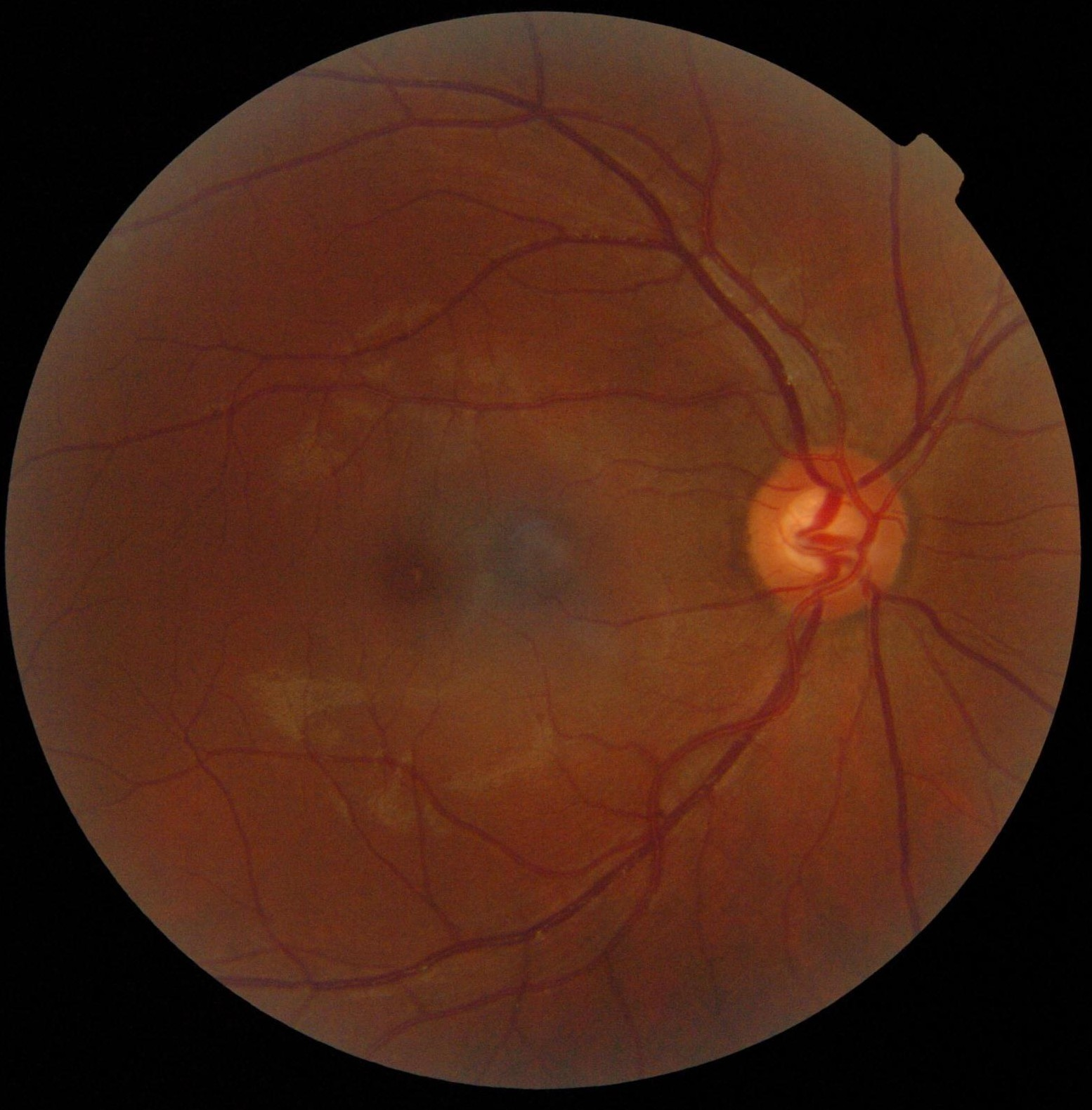
A fundus photo, showing the optic disc as a bright area on the right where blood vessels converge. The spot to the left of the centre is the macula. The grey, more diffuse spot in the centre is a shadow artifact.

The fundus of the eye is the interior surface of the eye opposite the lens and includes the retina, optic disc, macula, fovea, and posterior pole. The fundus can be examined by ophthalmoscopy and/or fundus photography.

== Variation ==
The color of the fundus varies both between and within species. In one study of primates the retina is blue, green, yellow, orange, and red; only the human fundus (from a lightly pigmented blond person) is red. The major differences among the "higher" primate species were size and regularity of the border of macular area, size and shape of the optic disc, apparent 'texturing' of retina, and pigmentation of retina.

== Clinical significance ==
Medical signs that can be detected from observation of eye fundus (generally by funduscopy) include hemorrhages, exudates, cotton wool spots, blood vessel abnormalities (tortuosity, pulsation and new vessels) and pigmentation. Arteriolar constriction, seen as "silver wiring", and vascular tortuosities are seen in hypertensive retinopathy.

The eye's fundus is the only part of the human body where the microcirculation can be observed directly. The diameter of the blood vessels around the optic disc is about 150 μm, and an ophthalmoscope allows observation of blood vessels with diameters as small as 10 μm.

== See also ==
- Dilated fundus examination
- Fundus camera
- Leukocoria
- Red-eye effect
- Tapetum lucidum
