= Protein kinase inhibitor =

Enzymes that block actions of protein kinases

A protein kinase inhibitor (PKI) is a type of enzyme inhibitor that blocks the action of one or more protein kinases. Protein kinases are enzymes that phosphorylate (add a phosphate, or PO_{4}, group) to a protein and can modulate its function.

The phosphate groups are usually added to serine, threonine, or tyrosine amino acids on the protein. Most kinases act on both serine and threonine, the tyrosine kinases act on tyrosine, and a number (dual-specificity kinases) act on all three. There are also protein kinases that phosphorylate other amino acids, including histidine kinases that phosphorylate histidine residues.

Phosphorylation regulates many biological processes, and protein kinase inhibitors can be used to treat diseases due to hyperactive protein kinases (including mutant or overexpressed kinases in cancer) or to modulate cell functions to overcome other disease drivers.

== Clinical use ==
Kinase inhibitors such as dasatinib are often used in the treatment of cancer and inflammation.

Some of the kinase inhibitors used in treating cancer are inhibitors of tyrosine kinases. The effectiveness of kinase inhibitors on various cancers can vary from patient to patient.

== Examples ==
There are several drugs launched or in development that target protein kinases and the receptors that activate them:

Name	Target	Company	Class	FDA approval
Adavosertib	WEE1	AstraZeneca	Small molecule	
Afatinib	EGFR/ErbB2	Boehringer Ingelheim	Small molecule	2013 Non-small cell lung cancer
Axitinib	VEGFR1/VEGFR2/VEGFR3/PDGFRB/c-KIT	Pfizer	Small molecule	2012 Renal cell carcinoma
Bosutinib	Bcr-Abl / SRC	Pfizer	Small molecule	2012 Chronic myelogenous leukemia
Cetuximab	EGFR	Imclone / BMS	Monoclonal antibody	2006 Mar (SCCHN)
Cobimetinib	MEK	Exelixis / Genentech-Roche	Small molecule	2015 Nov (Advanced melanoma with BRAF mutation) in Combination with Vemurafenib (BRAF)
Crizotinib	ALK/Met	Pfizer	Small molecule	2011 Aug (NSCLC with Alk mutation)
Cabozantinib	RET/MET/VEGFR2	Exelixis	Small molecule	2012 Nov (Metastatic medullary thyroid cancer)
Dacomitinib	EGFR/ErbB2/ErbB4	Pfizer	Small molecule	2018 Non-small cell lung cancer
Dasatinib	multiple targets	BMS	Small molecule	2006
Entrectinib	TrkA/TrkB/TrkC/ROS1/ALK	Ignyta	Small molecule	2004
Erdafitinib	FGFR	Janssen	Small molecule	2019
Erlotinib	EGFR	Genentech	Small molecule	2004
Fostamatinib	Syk	Rigel Pharmaceuticals / AstraZeneca	Small molecule	
Gefitinib	EGFR	AstraZeneca	Small molecule	2003 non-small cell lung cancer (NSCLC)
Ibrutinib	BTK	Pharmacyclics	Small molecule	2013
Imatinib	Bcr-Abl	Novartis	Small molecule	2001 (CML), 2002 (GIST)
Lapatinib	EGFR/ErbB2	GSK	Small molecule	2007 (HER2+ Breast)
Lenvatinib	VEGFR2	Eisai Co.	Small molecule	2015 (thyroid), 2016 (renal)
Mubritinib	?	Takeda	Small molecule	
Nilotinib	Bcr-Abl	Novartis	Small molecule	2007
Pazopanib	VEGFR2/PDGFR/c-kit	GlaxoSmithKline	Small molecule	2009 (RCC)
Pegaptanib	VEGF	OSI/ Pfizer	RNA Aptamer	2004 (AMD)
Ruxolitinib	JAK	Incyte	Small molecule	2011 (Myelofibrosis)
Sorafenib	multiple targets	Onyx / Bayer	Small molecule	2005 Dec (kidney)
Sunitinib	multiple targets	SUGEN / Pfizer	Small molecule	2006 Jan (RCC & GIST)
SU6656	Src, others	SUGEN	Small molecule	
Tucatinib	HER2	Seattle Genetics	Small molecule	2020
Vandetanib	RET/VEGFR/EGFR	AstraZeneca	Small molecule	2011
Vemurafenib	BRAF	Roche	Small molecule	2011 Aug (Advanced melanoma with BRAF mutation)

== Comparison of available agents ==
Comparison of available agents used as Human Medicines
Drug	Sponsor	Target	Indications	Major toxicities	Black box warning(s)	MS (Note: Myelosuppression.)	D	FR	PC (AU) (Note: PC = Pregnancy category)	PC (US)	FDA AD	EMA AD	TGA AD
Afatinib	Boehringer Ingelheim	ErbB family (irreversible)	Advanced non-small cell lung cancer	Hepatotoxicity, kidney failure, electrolyte anomalies (mostly hypokalaemia) and interstitial lung disease (uncommon).	None	-	+++	-	C	D	12 July 2013	25 September 2013	7 November 2013
Aflibercept	Bayer, Regeneron Pharmaceuticals	VEGF	Advanced colorectal cancer and wet macular degeneration.	GI perforation, haemorrhage and hepatotoxicity	None	+++/++	+++/++	-	D	C	21 November 2011	22 November 2012	2 April 2013
Axitinib	Pfizer	VEGFR, PDGFR, c-KIT	Renal cell carcinoma	Thyroid dysfunction, blood clots, haemorrhages, reversible posterior leucoencephalopathy syndrome (uncommon), GI perforation/fistula (uncommon) and electrolyte disturbances	None	++	++	-	D	D	27 January 2012	3 September 2012	26 July 2012
Bevacizumab	Genentech	VEGF	Colorectal cancer, breast cancer, non-small cell lung cancer, renal cell carcinoma, macular degeneration and glioblastoma	Hypertension, GI perforation, ovarian failure, GI haemorrhage, blood clots, electrolyte anomalies, ileus, congestive heart failure, osteonecrosis of the jaw (rare), necrotising fasciitis (rare), gallbladder perforation (rare)	GI perforation, haemorrhage and wound healing complications	++	++/+	-	D	C	26 February 2004	12 January 2005	24 February 2005
Bosutinib	Pfizer	Bcr-Abl	Second-line Chronic myelogenous leukaemia treatment	Lower respiratory tract infection, anaphylaxis (uncommon), electrolyte anomalies, cardiovascular effects (especially QT interval prolongation), GI haemorrhage (uncommon), hepatotoxicity and kidney failure.	None	++/+	+++	+	N/A	D	4 September 2012	27 March 2013	N/A
Cabozantinib	Exelixis	c-Met, VEGFR2	Metastatic thyroid cancer	Electrolyte anomalies, hypotension, peripheral sensory neuropathy, GI perforation/fistula, reversible posterior leucoencephalopathy syndrome (rare), blood clots and osteonecrosis.	GI haemorrhage, perforation and fistula	++	+++/++	-	N/A	D	29 November 2012	N/A	N/A
Crizotinib	Pfizer	ALK, HGFR, c-MET	Anaplastic lymphoma kinase-positive non-small cell lung cancer	Peripheral neuropathy, electrolyte anomalies, blood clots, kidney cyst, liver failure, interstitial lung disease and cardiotoxicity (probably QT interval prolongation).	None	++	++	++/+	D	D	26 August 2011	23 October 2012	27 September 2013
Dacomitinib	Pfizer	ErbB family (irreversible)	Advanced non-small cell lung cancer	Diarrhea, rash, fatigue.	None	N/A	N/A	N/A	N/A	N/A	27 September 2018	2 April 2019	-
Dasatinib	Bristol-Myers Squibb	Bcr-Abl, Src, c-KIT	Second-line Chronic myelogenous leukaemia treatment	Electrolyte disturbances, haemorrhages, fluid retention, heart failure (uncommon), myocardial infarction (uncommon) and pulmonary hypertension	None	+/-	++	++	D	D	28 June 2006	20 November 2006	15 January 2007
Erlotinib	Roche	EGFR	Advanced non-small cell lung cancer and pancreatic cancer	GI bleeds (rare), liver failure (rare), hepatorenal syndrome (rare), EGFR skin reactions and interstitial lung disease(uncommon).	None	-	+++/++	-	C	D	18 November 2004	19 September 2005	30 January 2006
Gefitinib	AstraZeneca, Teva	EGFR	Advanced non-small cell lung cancer with EGFR mutation	Haemorrhage, EGFR skin reactions (including Stevens–Johnson syndrome [SJS; rare] and toxic epidermal necrolysis[TEN; rare]), liver failure (rare), hepatitis (uncommon), pancreatitis (uncommon) and interstitial lung disease (uncommon).	N/A	-	+++/++	-	C	D	5 May 2003 (discontinued)	24 June 2009	7 September 2011
Imatinib	Novartis	Bcr-Abl	First-line chronic myelogenous leukaemia treatment	Haemorrhage, electrolyte disturbances, cardiotoxicity (uncommon), kidney failure (uncommon), GI perforation, hepatotoxicity (rare) and rhabdomyolysis (rare)	N/A	+++/++	+	++	D	D	10 May 2001	7 November 2001	13 August 2001
Lapatinib	GlaxoSmithKline	HER2	HER2-positive advanced breast cancer	Hypersensitivity (rare), hepatotoxicity (uncommon), interstitial lung disease (uncommon) and cardiovascular problems.	Hepatotoxicity	-	++	-	C	D	13 March 2007	10 June 2008	28 June 2007
Nilotinib	Novartis	Bcr-Abl	Second-line chronic myelogenous leukaemia treatment	Hyperglycaemia, electrolyte disturbances, fluid retention, pancreatitis and cardiotoxicity (mostly QT interval prolongation).	QT interval prolongation and electrolyte anomalies	++	+	+	D	D	29 October 2007	2 June 2009	17 January 2008
Panitumumab	Amgen	EGFR	Colorectal cancer	Electrolyte anomalies, anaphylaxis, blood clots, sepsis and pulmonary fibrosis.	Dermatologic reactions and infusion reactions	-	+	+	C	C	10 October 2006	3 December 2007	20 March 2012
Pazopanib	GlaxoSmithKline	VEGFR, PDGFR, c-KIT	Renal cell carcinoma and soft tissue sarcoma	Cardiotoxicity (mostly QT interval prolongation but also heart failure [uncommon]), blood clots, haemorrhage, thyroid anomalies (mostly hypothyroidism), blood glucose anomalies (hypoglycaemia and hyperglycaemia), torsades de pointes (uncommon), hepatotoxicity (uncommon), GI perforation/fistula (uncommon) and reversible posterior leucoencephalopathy syndrome (rare).	Hepatotoxicity	-	++	-	D	D	19 October 2009	14 June 2010	30 June 2010
Pegaptanib	OSI, Pfizer	VEGF	Wet macular degeneration	Hypertension, cataracts, haemorrhage, vitreous floater, transient ischaemic attack, retinal detachment, diabetes mellitus and urinary tract infection	None	-	+/-	++	N/A	B	17 December 2004	31 January 2006	N/A
Ponatinib	ARIAD Pharmaceuticals	Bcr-Abl, BEGFR, PDGFR, FGFR, EPH, SRC, c-KIT, RET, TIE2, FLT3	T315I-positive Chronic myelogenous leukaemia and T315I-positive-Acute lymphoblastic leukaemia	Hypertension, pneumonia, urinary tract infection, sepsis, GI haemorrhage, liver failure, cardiovascular problems and blood clots.	Liver failure, blood clots and hepatotoxicity	++	+	+	N/A	D	14 December 2012	1 July 2013	N/A
Ranibizumab	Novartis	VEGF-A	Wet macular degeneration and macular oedema (including diabetic macular oedema)	Haemorrhage (conjunctival, vitreous and injection site), increased intraocular pressure, vitreous detachment and retinal degeneration.	None	-	-	-	D	C	10 August 2012	22 January 2007	27 February 2007
Regorafenib	Bayer	RET, VEGFR, PDGFR	Advanced colorectal cancer, gastrointestinal stromal tumours	Electrolyte anomalies, hepatotoxicity, hypotension, haemorrhage, GI fistula, thyroid problems and blood clots.	Hepatotoxicity	+++/++	++	-	D	D	27 September 2012	26 August 2013	29 November 2013
Ruxolitinib	Novartis	JAK	Myelofibrosis	Hypercholesterolaemia, urinary tract infection, herpes zoster, tuberculosis and hepatotoxicity	None	+++	-	-	C	C	16 November 2011	23 August 2012	3 July 2013
Sorafenib	Bayer	VEGFR, PDGFR, BRAF, c-KIT, etc.	Advanced Renal cell carcinoma and Hepatocellular carcinoma	Hypertension, peripheral neuropathy, thyroid dysfunction, cardiovascular problems (e.g. QT interval prolongation, heart attack or heart failure), electrolyte anomalies, GI perforation (uncommon), pancreatitis (uncommon), hepatitis (rare), nephrotic syndrome (rare) and reversible posterior leucoencephalopathy syndrome (rare)	None	++	++	-	D	D	20 December 2005	19 July 2006	27 September 2006
Sunitinib	Pfizer	VEGFR, PDGFR	Renal cell carcinoma, GI stromal tumour, pancreatic neuroendocrine tumour	Blood clots, cardiovascular problems (mostly heart failure or left ventricular dysfunction but also QT interval prolongation and torsades de pointes), thyroid dysfunction, electrolyte anomalies, skin reactions (including SJS [rare] and TEN [rare]), liver failure (uncommon) and pancreatitis (uncommon).	Hepatotoxicity	+	++	+	D	D	26 January 2006	19 July 2006	14 September 2006
Tofacitinib	Pfizer	JAK	Rheumatoid arthritis	Infections and malignancies	Serious infections and malignancies	-	-	-	N/A	C	6 November 2012	N/A; refused 26 April 2013	N/A
Trastuzumab	Genentech	HER2	Breast cancer (for either metastatic disease or adjuvant treatment), metastatic gastric cancer	Congestive heart failure, depression, pulmonary toxicity, infections and tachycardia (heart high rate)	Pulmonary toxicity, cardiomyopathy and a confusion warning	-	+	+	B2	D	25 September 1998	28 August 2000	14 September 2000
Tucatinib	Seattle Genetics	HER2	Advanced unresectable or metastatic HER2-positive breast cancer	Diarrhea, hepatotoxicity, embryo-fetal toxicity	None						April 2020		August 2020
Vandetanib	AstraZeneca	VEGFR, EGFR, RET, BRK	Advanced medullary thyroid cancer	Urinary tract infection, hypertension, QT interval prolongation, electrolyte anomalies, depression, GI perforation and thyroid anomalies	QT interval prolongation	-	++	-	D	D	21 April 2011	17 February 2012	31 January 2013
Vemurafenib	Roche	BRAF	Metastatic melanoma	Photosensitivity, squamous cell carcinoma and hepatotoxicity	None	-	+	+	D	D	17 August 2011	10 May 2012	17 February 2012

Note:
AD = Approval date.
MS = Myelosuppression.
D = Diarrhoea.
FR = Fluid retention.
As far as myelosuppression, diarrhoea and fluid retention goes: +++ means >70% of patients exhibit clinically significant myelosuppression. ++ means 30-70% of patients exhibit significant myelosuppression. + means 10-30% of patients exhibit significant myelosuppression. - means 0-10% of patients exhibit this side effect.
General references templates are given, which refer the reader to the respective drug database.

== See also ==
- Tyrosine kinase inhibitor
