= Neratinib =

Chemical compound

Clinical data
- Trade names: Nerlynx, Hernix
- Other names: HKI-272
- AHFS/Drugs.com: Monograph
- MedlinePlus: a617034
- License data: EU EMA: by INN; US DailyMed: Neratinib; US FDA: Nerlynx
- Pregnancy category: AU: D
- Routes of administration: By mouth
- Drug class: Antineoplastic agent
- ATC code: L01EH02 (WHO)

Legal status
- Legal status: AU: S4 (Prescription only); CA: ℞-only; UK: POM (Prescription only); US: ℞-only; EU: Rx-only

Identifiers
- IUPAC name: (2E)-N-[4-[[3-Chloro-4-[(pyridin-2-yl)methoxy]phenyl]amino]-3-cyano-7-ethoxyquinolin-6-yl]-4-(dimethylamino)but-2-enamide
- CAS Number: 698387-09-6
- PubChem CID: 9915743
- IUPHAR/BPS: 5686
- DrugBank: DB11828
- ChemSpider: 8091392
- UNII: JJH94R3PWB
- KEGG: D08950; as salt: D10898
- ChEMBL: ChEMBL180022
- CompTox Dashboard (EPA): DTXSID70220132
- ECHA InfoCard: 100.241.512

Chemical and physical data
- Formula: C_{30}H_{29}ClN_{6}O_{3}
- Molar mass: 557.05 g·mol^{−1}
- 3D model (JSmol): Interactive image
- SMILES: CCOc1cc2ncc(C#N)c(Nc3ccc(OCc4ccccn4)c(Cl)c3)c2cc1NC(=O)C=CCN(C)C
- InChI: InChI=1S/C30H29ClN6O3/c1-4-39-28-16-25-23(15-26(28)36-29(38)9-7-13-37(2)3)30(20(17-32)18-34-25)35-21-10-11-27(24(31)14-21)40-19-22-8-5-6-12-33-22/h5-12,14-16,18H,4,13,19H2,1-3H3,(H,34,35)(H,36,38)/b9-7+; Key:JWNPDZNEKVCWMY-VQHVLOKHSA-N

Neratinib (INN), sold under the brand name Nerlynx, is a tyrosine kinase inhibitor anti-cancer medication used for the treatment of breast cancer.

The most common side effect is diarrhea, which affects nearly all patients. Other common side effects include nausea (feeling sick), vomiting, tiredness, belly pain, rash, decreased appetite, stomatitis (sore, inflamed mouth), and muscle spasms.

== Medical uses ==
In the European Union and the United States, neratinib is indicated for the extended adjuvant treatment of adults with early stage (human epidermal growth factor receptor 2) HER2-overexpressed/amplified breast cancer and who are less than one year from the completion of prior adjuvant trastuzumab based therapy.

In the United States, it is also indicated, in combination with capecitabine, for the treatment of adults with advanced or metastatic HER2-positive breast cancer who have received two or more prior anti-HER2 based regimens in the metastatic setting.

== Contraindications ==
Women who are pregnant should not take it, and women should not become pregnant while taking it, and women who are breast-feeding should not use it, as it can cause harm to the fetus and to the baby.

== Adverse effects ==
Neratinib can cause life-threatening diarrhea in some people and mild to moderate diarrhea in almost everyone; people who take it are also at risk for complications of diarrhea like dehydration and electrolyte imbalance. Similarly, there is a risk of severe liver damage and many patients have some level of it; symptoms of liver damage include fatigue, nausea, vomiting, right upper quadrant pain or tenderness, fever, rash, and high levels of eosinophils.

In addition to the above, more than 10% of people taking it have nausea, abdominal pain, vomiting, sores on their lips, stomach upset, decreased appetite, rashes, and muscle spasms.

== Interactions ==
People taking neratinib should avoid concurrent use of gastric acid–reducing agents, including proton pump inhibitors and H2-receptor antagonists. Antacids may be taken at least three hours before or after administration of neratinib.

Drugs that inhibit CYP3A4 increase the activity of neratinib and can make adverse effects worse, and drugs that induce CYP3A4 make neratinib less active and can reduce its efficacy. Neratinib also inhibits p-glycoprotein and effectively raises the dose of drugs like digoxin that depend on it for elimination.

== Pharmacology ==
Like lapatinib and afatinib, it is a dual inhibitor of the human epidermal growth factor receptor 2 (Her2) and epidermal growth factor receptor (EGFR) kinases. It inhibits them by covalently binding with a cysteine side chain in those proteins. Unlike related noncovalent inhibitors, neratinib is effective against the T790M resistant variant of EGFR.

Neratinib has an IC_{50} of 59 nM against HER2 and shows weak inhibition against KDR and Scr with IC_{50} values of 0.8 μM and 1.4 μM, respectively. In BT474 cells, neratinib reduces HER2 autophosphorylation, and inhibited cyclin D1 expression while reduced proliferation has been observed A431 cells when treated with neratinib at concentrations of 3 or 5 nM. In xenograft models with 3T3/neu tumors oral administration of neratinib at 10, 20, 40 or 80 mg/kg was able to inhibit tumor growth while in SK-OV-3 models doses of 5 and 60 mg/kg significantly inhibited tumor growth.

== Cell biology ==
Neratinib is found to strongly reduce the amount of HER2 released by extracellular vesicles and to enhance the capacity of clathrin mediated endocytosis. However, despite HER2 mediated signaling downregulation, Neratinib exerts only a modest effect on HER2 trafficking at IC50 of 6nM in SKBR3 cells.

== Chemistry ==
Neratinib is a 4-anilino-3-cyano quinoline derivative.

== History ==
Neratinib was discovered and initially developed by Wyeth; Pfizer continued development up to Phase III in breast cancer, and licensed it to Puma Biotechnology in 2011.

It was approved for medical use in the United States in July 2017, for the extended adjuvant treatment of adults with early stage HER2-overexpressed/amplified breast cancer, (after adjuvant trastuzumab-based therapy). Approval was based on the ExteNET trial (NCT00878709), a multicenter, randomized, double-blind, placebo-controlled trial of neratinib following adjuvant trastuzumab treatment.

Neratinib was approved for medical use in the European Union in August 2018.

== Brand names ==
In Bangladesh it is sold under the trade name Hernix.
