= Osimertinib =

Chemical compound, used as a medication to treat lung cancer

Clinical data
- Trade names: Tagrisso, others
- Other names: AZD9291, mereletinib, osimertinib mesilate (JAN JP), osimertinib mesylate (USAN US)
- AHFS/Drugs.com: Monograph
- MedlinePlus: a616005
- License data: US DailyMed: Osimertinib
- Pregnancy category: AU: D
- Routes of administration: By mouth
- ATC code: L01EB04 (WHO)

Legal status
- Legal status: AU: S4 (Prescription only); CA: ℞-only; US: ℞-only; EU: Rx-only

Pharmacokinetic data
- Protein binding: Probably high
- Metabolism: Oxidation (CYP3A)
- Elimination half-life: 48 hours
- Excretion: Feces (68%), urine (14%)

Identifiers
- IUPAC name: N-(2-{[2-(dimethylamino)ethyl](methyl)amino}-4-methoxy-5-{[4-(1-methyl-1H-indol-3-yl)pyrimidin-2-yl]amino}phenyl)prop-2-enamide
- CAS Number: 1421373-65-0
- PubChem CID: 71496458
- DrugBank: DB09330
- ChemSpider: 31042598
- UNII: 3C06JJ0Z2O
- KEGG: D10766
- ChEBI: CHEBI:90943
- PDB ligand: YY3 (PDBe, RCSB PDB)
- CompTox Dashboard (EPA): DTXSID501025961

Chemical and physical data
- Formula: C_{28}H_{33}N_{7}O_{2}
- Molar mass: 499.619 g·mol^{−1}
- 3D model (JSmol): Interactive image
- SMILES: C=CC(=O)Nc1cc(Nc2nccc(-c3cn(C)c4ccccc34)n2)c(OC)cc1N(C)CCN(C)C
- InChI: InChI=1S/C28H33N7O2/c1-7-27(36)30-22-16-23(26(37-6)17-25(22)34(4)15-14-33(2)3)32-28-29-13-12-21(31-28)20-18-35(5)24-11-9-8-10-19(20)24/h7-13,16-18H,1,14-15H2,2-6H3,(H,30,36)(H,29,31,32); Key:DUYJMQONPNNFPI-UHFFFAOYSA-N

Osimertinib, sold under the brand name Tagrisso, is a medication used to treat non-small-cell lung carcinomas with specific mutations. It is a third-generation epidermal growth factor receptor tyrosine kinase inhibitor.

The most common side effects include diarrhea, rash, musculoskeletal pain, dry skin, skin inflammation around nails, sore mouth, fatigue, and cough.

Osimertinib was approved for medical use in the United States in November 2015, and in the European Union in February 2016.

== Medical uses ==
Osimertinib is used to treat patients with non-small-cell lung cancer (NSCLC) whose tumors have EGFR exon 19 deletion, L858R substitution in three clinical situations: after surgery with complete removal of the cancer, after the combination of chemotherapy and radiation for patients with stage III NSCLC, or in patients with metastatic NSCLC.^{,} It is also used in patients who acquire the EGFR T790M mutation following treatment with other EGFR tyrosine kinase inhibitors, such as gefitinib, erlotinib, and afatinib.

In the US, the FDA label states that EGFR exon 19 deletions, exon 21 L858R mutations, or the T790M status of the patient must be detected by a companion diagnostic test before treatment with osimertinib. The Food and Drug Administration (FDA) has approved multiple tests, including FoundationOne CDx for this purpose. In Europe and elsewhere, activating EGFR mutations or T790M mutations may be determined by a validated test. In routine practice, patients are often treated based on mutations identified using tests that are not FDA approved.

In February 2024, the FDA approved osimertinib, in combination with platinum-based chemotherapy, for people with locally advanced or metastatic non-small cell lung cancer whose tumors have EGFR exon 19 deletions or exon 21 L858R mutations, as detected by an FDA-approved test.

In September 2024, the FDA approved osimertinib for adults with locally advanced, unresectable (stage III) non-small cell lung cancer (NSCLC) whose disease has not progressed during or following concurrent or sequential platinum-based chemoradiation therapy and whose tumors have EGFR exon 19 deletions or exon 21 L858R mutations, as detected by an FDA-approved test.

=== Development of resistance ===
In people treated with osimertinib, resistance usually develops within approximately ten months. Resistance mediated by an exon 20 C797S mutation accounts for the majority of resistance cases, which has resulted in multiple attempts with non-ATP competitive or allosteric inhibitors to try and offset this acquired resistance by targeting other regions of the RTK kinase domain.

== Adverse effects ==
Very common (greater than 10% of clinical trial subjects) adverse effects include diarrhea, stomatitis, rashes, dry or itchy skin, infections where finger or toenails abut skin, low platelet counts, low leukocyte counts, and low neutrophil counts.

Common (between 1% and 10% of clinical trial subjects) adverse effects include interstitial lung disease.

It can cause fetal harm.

== Interactions ==
Osimertinib is metabolized by CYP3A4 and CYP3A5, so substances that strongly inhibit either enzyme, like macrolide antibiotics, antifungals, and antivirals may increase exposure to osimertinib, and substances like rifampicin that activate either enzyme may decrease the effectiveness of osimertinib.

== Pharmacology ==
Osimertinib preferentially binds irreversibly to mutated epidermal growth factor receptor proteins, particularly those with more common mutations in lung cancer such as L858R mutation or an exon 19 deletion.

It exhibits linear pharmacokinetics; the median time to Cmax is 6 hours (range 3–24 hours). The estimated mean half-life is 48 hours, and oral clearance (CL/F) is 14.3 (L/h). 68% of elimination is by feces and 14% by urine.

== Chemistry ==
Osimertinib is provided as the mesylate; the chemical formula is C_{28}H_{33}N_{7}O_{2}·CH_{4}O_{3}S, and the molecular weight is 596 g/mol. The chemical name is N-(2-{2-dimethylaminoethyl-methylamino}-4-methoxy-5-{[4-(1-methylindol-3-yl)pyrimidin-2-yl]amino}phenyl)prop-2-enamide mesylate salt.

== History ==
The drug discovery program that led to osimertinib started in 2009 and yielded the drug by 2012; the process was structure-driven and aimed to find a third-generation EGFR inhibitor that would selectively target the T790M form of the EGFR receptor.

Osimertinib was designated as a breakthrough therapy in April 2014, based on phase I trial results, and the drug was provisionally approved under the FDA accelerated approval program with a priority review voucher, in November 2015. Full FDA approval was granted in March of 2017.

In February 2016, the EMA provisionally approved osimertinib under an accelerated process—the first approval under the program.

In April 2018, osimertinib received US FDA approval for first-line treatment of patients with metastatic NSCLC whose tumors have EGFR exon 19 deletions or L858R substitution mutations. The EMA gave a similar approval in June 2018. These approvals were based on the FLAURA study that enrolled patients with previously-untreated advanced NSCLC with EGFR exon 19 deletion or L858R, randomizing them to osimertinib or the control arm (that received either erlotinib or gefitinib). Patients treated with osimertinib had an improved progression-free and overall survival compared with the control arm.

In December 2020, the FDA approved osimertinib for adjuvant therapy after surgical resection of early stage NSCLC with EGFR exon 19 deletions or L858R substitution mutations. The EMA granted a similar approval in May 2021. These approvals were based on the AdAURA study that randomized patients with completely resected stage IB-III NSCLC to either 3 years of osimertinib or placebo, demonstrating improvement in disease free survival. Later followup of the AdAURA study showed improvement in overall survival with osimertinib treatment.

In February 2024, the FDA approved osimertinib in combination with platinum-based chemotherapy, for people with locally advanced or metastatic non-small cell lung cancer whose tumors have EGFR exon 19 deletions or exon 21 L858R mutations, as detected by an FDA-approved test. The EMA granted a similar approval in July 2024. Efficacy was evaluated in FLAURA 2 (NCT04035486), an open-label, randomized trial of 557 participants with EGFR exon 19 deletion or exon 21 L858R mutation-positive NSCLC and no prior systemic therapy for advanced disease. Participants were randomized 1:1 to receive either osimertinib with platinum-based chemotherapy or osimertinib monotherapy. The trial showed improvement in progression-free survival and overall survival with osimertinib and platinum-based chemotherapy compared with osimertinib monotherapy. The application was granted priority review, fast track, breakthrough therapy, and orphan drug designations.

In September of 2024, the FDA approved osimertinib for treatment of patients with stage III NSCLC with EGFR exon 19 deletion or exon 21 L858R substitution mutation who have received chemoradiation. The EMA granted a similar approval in December 2024. These approvals were based on the LAURA study that enrolled patients with unresectable stage III NSCLC with EGFR exon 19 deletion or exon 21 L858R who had not progressed after completion of chemoradiotherapy, randomizing them to osimertinib or placebo. In this study, patients who received osimertinib had a longer progression-free survival.

== Society and culture ==
=== Economics ===
At launch, in the United States, AstraZeneca priced the drug at US$12,750 per month.
