= Dioxamycin =

Names
- IUPAC name (2S,4S,5S)-4-[(1E,3E,5E)-7-[(2R,6R)-6-[(2R,3S,4aR,12bS)-2,3,4a,8,12b-pentahydroxy-3-methyl-1,7,12-trioxo-2,4-dihydrobenzo[a]anthracen-9-yl]-2-methyloxan-3-yl]oxy-7-oxohepta-1,3,5-trienyl]-2,5-dimethyl-1,3-dioxolane-2-carboxylic acid

Identifiers
CAS Number	134861-62-4
3D model (JSmol)	Interactive image
ChemSpider	4945441
PubChem CID	6441245
- InChI: InChI=1S/C38H40O15/c1-18-23(51-26(39)10-8-6-5-7-9-24-19(2)52-36(4,53-24)34(45)46)13-14-25(50-18)20-11-12-21-27(29(20)40)30(41)22-15-16-37(48)17-35(3,47)32(43)33(44)38(37,49)28(22)31(21)42/h5-12,15-16,18-19,23-25,32,40,43,47-49H,13-14,17H2,1-4H3,(H,45,46)/b6-5+,9-7+,10-8+/t18-,19+,23?,24+,25-,32+,35+,36+,37+,38-/m1/s1 Key: HWMMBHOXHRVLCU-QOUANJGESA-N
- SMILES: C[C@H]1[C@@H](O[C@@](O1)(C)C(=O)O)/C=C/C=C/C=C/C(=O)OC2CC[C@@H](O[C@@H]2C)C3=C(C4=C(C=C3)C(=O)C5=C(C4=O)C=C[C@]6([C@@]5(C(=O)[C@@H]([C@@](C6)(C)O)O)O)O)O

Properties
Chemical formula	C_{38}H_{40}O_{15}
Molar mass	736.723 g·mol^{−1}
- Except where otherwise noted, data are given for materials in their standard state (at 25 °C [77 °F], 100 kPa). Infobox references

Dioxamycin is a benz[a]anthraquinone antibiotic and kinase inhibitor with the molecular formula C_{38}H_{40}O_{15}. Dioxamycin is produced by the bacterium Streptomyces cocklensis and Streptomyces xantholiticus.
