= Targeted covalent inhibitors =

Type of inhibitor

Targeted covalent inhibitors (TCIs) or Targeted covalent drugs are rationally designed inhibitors that bind and then bond to their target proteins. These inhibitors possess a bond-forming functional group of low chemical reactivity (electrophilic warhead) that, following binding to the target protein, is positioned to react rapidly with a proximate nucleophilic residue at the target site to form a bond.

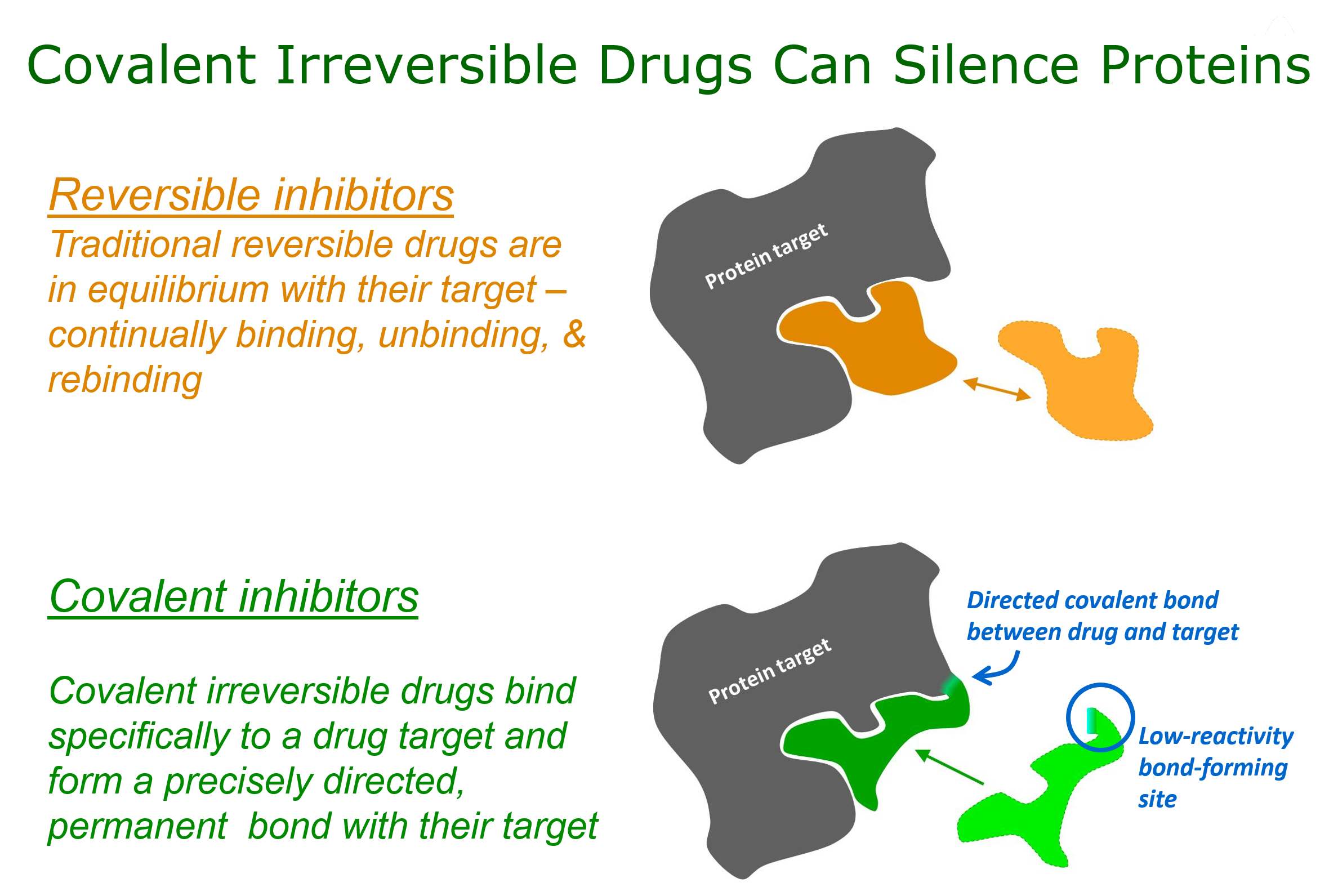
This illustration describes the mechanism by which covalent drugs irreversibly bind and modify the protein, e.g. silencing its activity

== Historical impact of covalent drugs ==
Over the last 100 years covalent drugs have made a major impact on human health and have been highly successful drugs for the pharmaceutical industry. These inhibitors react with their target proteins to form a covalent complex in which the protein has lost its function. The majority of these successful drugs, which include penicillin, omeprazole, clopidogrel, and aspirin were discovered through serendipity in phenotypic screens.

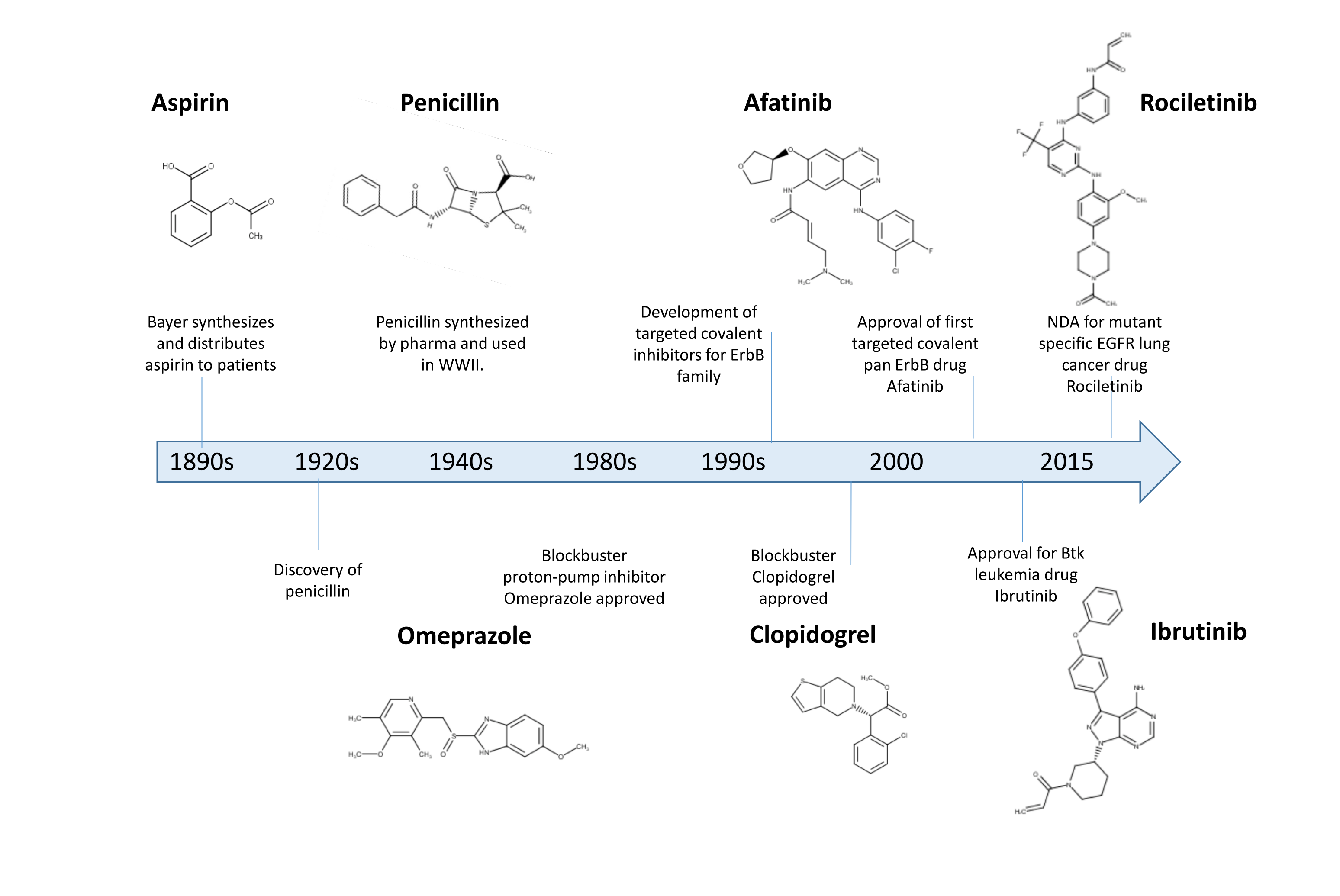
A brief timeline representation of the history of covalent drugs that have been approved to be marketed

However, key changes in screening approaches, along with safety concerns, have made pharma reluctant to pursue covalent inhibitors in a systematic way (Liebler & Guengerich, 2005). Recently, there has been considerable attention to using rational drug design to create highly selective covalent inhibitors called targeted covalent inhibitors. The first published example of a targeted covalent drug was for the EGFR kinase. But this has now broadened to other kinases and other protein families. Aside from small molecules, covalent probes are also being derived from peptides or proteins. By incorporation of a reactive group into a binding peptide or protein via posttranslational chemical modification or as an unnatural amino acid, a target protein can be conjugated specifically via proximity-induced reaction.

== Advantages of covalent drugs ==
=== Potency ===
Covalent bonding can lead to potencies and ligand efficiencies that are either exceptionally high or, for irreversible covalent interactions, even essentially infinite. Covalent bonding thus allows high potency to be routinely achieved in compounds of low molecular mass, along with all the beneficial pharmaceutical properties that are associated with small size.

=== Selectivity ===
Covalent inhibitors can be designed to target a nucleophile that is unique or rare across a protein family. Thereby ensuring that covalent bond formation cannot occur with most other family members. This approach can lead to high selectivity against closely related proteins because although the inhibitor might bind transiently to the active sites of such proteins, it will not covalently label them if they lack the targeted nucleophilic residue in the appropriate position.

=== Pharmacodynamics ===
The restoration of pharmacological activity after covalent irreversible inhibition requires re-synthesis of the protein target. This has important and potentially advantageous consequences for drug pharmacodynamics in which the level and frequency of dosing relates to the extent and duration of the resulting pharmacological effect.

=== Built-in-biomarker ===
Covalent inhibitors can be used to assess target engagement which can sometimes be used pre-clinically and clinically to assess the relationship between dose of drug and efficacy or toxicity. This approach was used for covalent Btk inhibitors pre-clinically and clinically to understand the relationship between dose administered and efficacy in animal models of arthritis and target occupancy in a clinical study of healthy volunteers.

== Design of covalent drugs ==
The design of covalent drugs requires careful optimization of both the non-covalent binding affinity (which is reflected in K_{i}) and the reactivity of the electrophilic warhead (which is reflected in k_{2}).

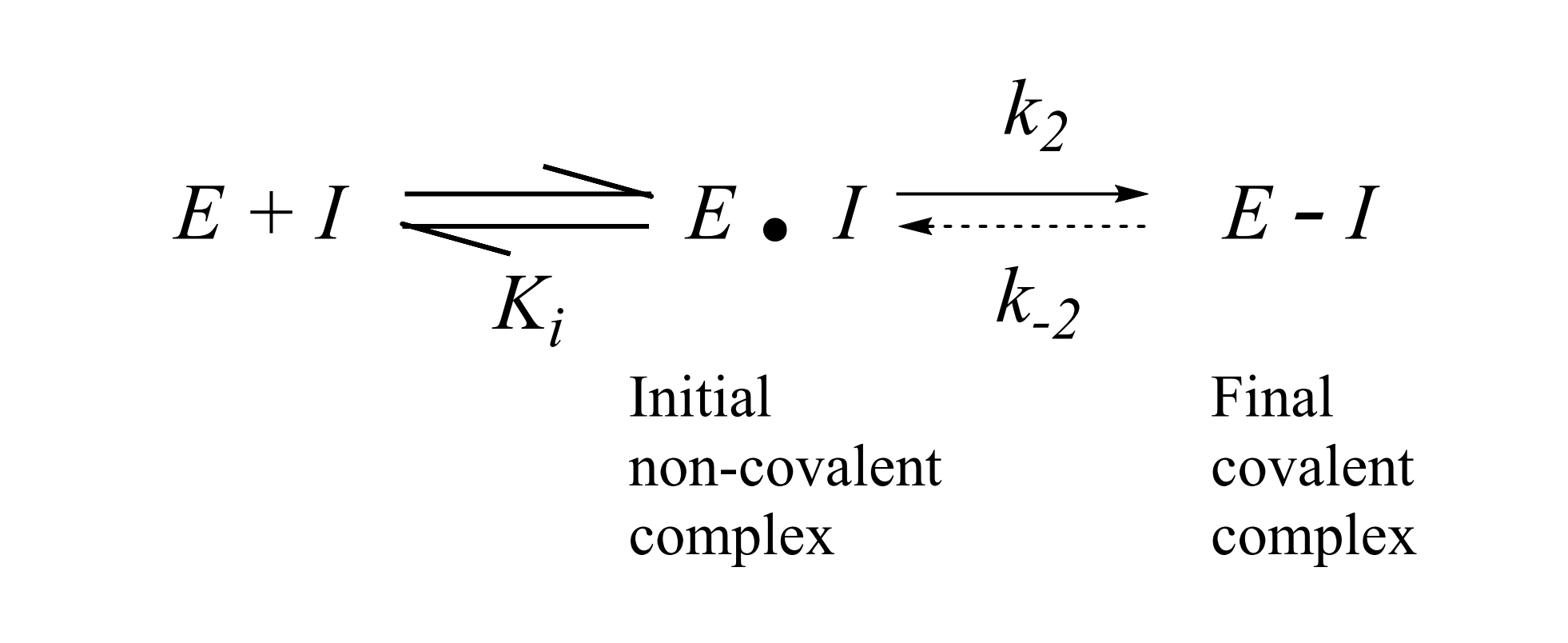
Mechanism of Action of Covalent Drugs

The initial design of TCIs involves three key steps. First, bioinformatics analysis is used to identify a nucleophilic amino acid (for example, cysteine) that is either inside or near to a functionally relevant binding site on a drug target, but is rare in that protein family. Next, a reversible inhibitor is identified for which the binding mode is known. Finally, structure-based computational methods are used to guide the design of modified ligands that have electrophilic functionality, and are positioned to react specifically with the nucleophilic amino acid in the target protein.

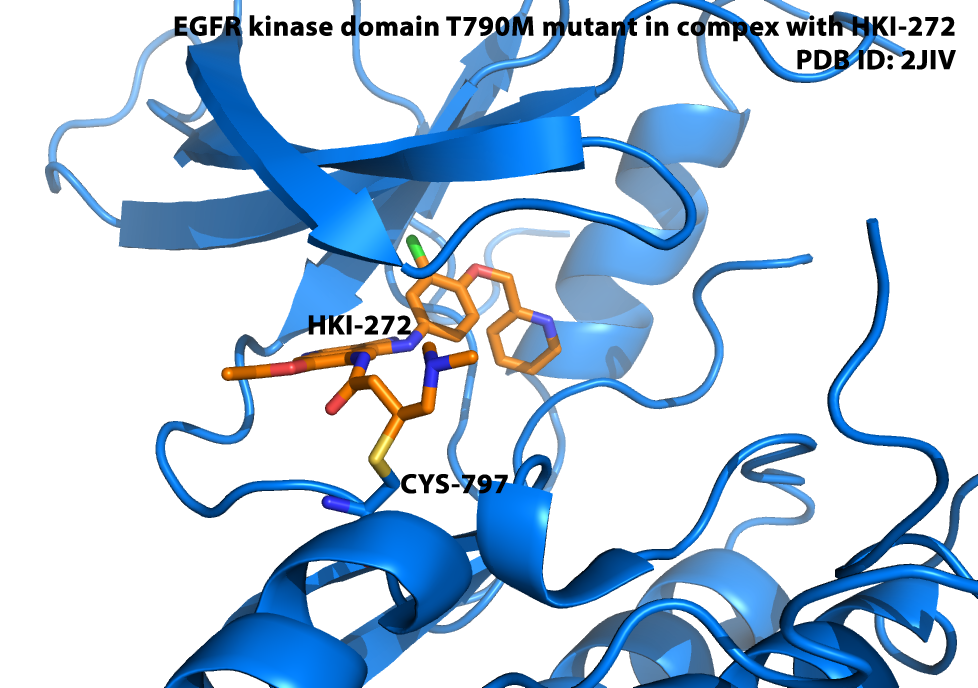
EGFR kinase T790M mutant covalently inhibited by HKI-272 (neratinib) at Cys-797 (PDB ID: 2JIV)

Targeted covalent photoisomerizable ligands (photoswitches) have been developed to remotely and reversibly control the activity of receptor proteins with light. They have been used as molecular prostheses to restore visual input in the retina and auditory input in the cochlea via glutamate receptors. Photoactivation by infrared light (two-photon excitation) has also been reported. Ligand conjugation is targeted to specific lysine residues via an affinity labeling mechanism.

== Toxicity risks associated with covalent modification of proteins ==
There has been a reluctance for modern drug discovery programs to consider covalent inhibitors due to toxicity concerns. An important contributor has been the drug toxicities of several high-profile drugs believed to be caused by metabolic activation of reversible drugs. For example, high dose acetaminophen can lead to the formation of the reactive metabolite N-acetyl-p-benzoquinone imine. Also, covalent inhibitors such as beta lactam antibiotics which contain weak electrophiles can lead to idiosyncratic toxicities (IDT) in some patients. It has been noted that many approved covalent inhibitors have been used safely for decades with no observed idiosyncratic toxicity. Also, that IDTs are not limited to proteins with a covalent mechanism of action. A recent analysis has noted that the risk of idiosyncratic toxicities may be mitigated through lower doses of administered drug. Doses of less than 10 mg per day rarely lead to IDT irrespective of the drug mechanism.

== TCIs in clinical development ==
Despite the apparent lack of attention towards covalent inhibitor drug discovery by most pharmaceutical companies, there are several examples of covalent drugs that have been approved or are progressing to late-stage clinical development.

=== KRAS and lung, colorectal cancer ===
AMG 510 by Amgen is a KRAS p.G12C covalent inhibitor that has recently finished Phase I clinical trial. The drug elicited partial responses in half of evaluable patients with KRAS G12C-mutant non–small cell lung cancer, and led to stable disease in most evaluable patients with colorectal (or appendix) cancer.

=== EGFR and lung cancer ===
The second generation EGFR inhibitors Afatinib and Mobocertinib have been approved for the treatment of EGFR driven lung cancer and Dacomitinib is in late stage clinical testing. The third generation EGFR inhibitors which target mutant EGFR which is specific to the tumor but are selective against wild-type EGFR that are expected to lead to a wider therapeutic index.

=== ErbB family and breast cancer ===
The pan-ErbB inhibitor Neratinib was approved in the US in 2017 and in the EU in 2018 for the extended adjuvant treatment of adult patients with early-stage HER2-overexpressed/amplified breast cancer after trastuzumab-based therapy.

=== Btk and leukemia ===
Ibrutinib, a covalent inhibitor of Bruton's tyrosine kinase, has been approved for the treatment of chronic lymphocytic leukemia, waldenstrom’s macroglobulinemia and mantle cell lymphoma.

=== SARS-CoV-2 protease and COVID-19 ===
Paxlovid is a covalent inhibitor of the 3CLpro (Mpro) enzyme. It is in Phase III trials for the early treatment of SARS-CoV-2 infected patients who have not progressed to severe COVID-19 disease, and who do not immediately require hospitalisation.
