= Oritinib =

Chemical compound

Clinical data
- Other names: SH-1028

Identifiers
- IUPAC name: N-[2-[2-(dimethylamino)ethyl-methylamino]-4-methoxy-5-[[4-(6,7,8,9-tetrahydropyrido[1,2-a]indol-10-yl)pyrimidin-2-yl]amino]phenyl]prop-2-enamide
- CAS Number: 2035089-28-0
- PubChem CID: 122666966
- ChemSpider: 115007246
- UNII: SK593H37SC

Chemical and physical data
- Formula: C_{31}H_{37}N_{7}O_{2}
- Molar mass: 539.684 g·mol^{−1}
- 3D model (JSmol): Interactive image
- SMILES: CN(C)CCN(C)C1=CC(=C(C=C1NC(=O)C=C)NC2=NC=CC(=N2)C3=C4CCCCN4C5=CC=CC=C53)OC
- InChI: InChI=InChI=1S/C31H37N7O2/c1-6-29(39)33-23-19-24(28(40-5)20-27(23)37(4)18-17-36(2)3)35-31-32-15-14-22(34-31)30-21-11-7-8-12-25(21)38-16-10-9-13-26(30)38/h6-8,11-12,14-15,19-20H,1,9-10,13,16-18H2,2-5H3,(H,33,39)(H,32,34,35); Key:PLUKVDOZEJBBIS-UHFFFAOYSA-N

Oritinib is an investigational new drug currently under investigation for its potential use in cancer treatment. As a epidermal growth factor receptor (EGFR) tyrosine kinase inhibitor, oritinib targets specific enzymes involved in the signaling pathways that regulate cell division and survival, which are often dysregulated in cancer cells.
