= Mobocertinib =

Small molecule tyrosine kinase inhibitor

Clinical data
- Trade names: Exkivity
- Other names: TAK-788, AP-32788
- License data: US DailyMed: Mobocertinib
- Pregnancy category: AU: D; Contraindicated
- Routes of administration: By mouth
- Drug class: Antineoplastic
- ATC code: L01EB10 (WHO)

Legal status
- Legal status: AU: S4 (Prescription only); UK: POM (Prescription only); US: ℞-only; Rx-only

Identifiers
- IUPAC name: Propan-2-yl 2-(4-{[2-(dimethylamino)ethyl]methylamino}-2-methoxy-5-(prop-2-enamido)anilino)-4-(1-methyl-1H-indol-3-yl)pyrimidine-5-carboxylate
- CAS Number: 1847461-43-1; as salt: 2389149-74-8
- PubChem CID: 118607832
- DrugBank: DB16390; as salt: DBSALT003192
- ChemSpider: 84455481
- UNII: 39HBQ4A67L; as salt: 53QIA92ZEE
- KEGG: D12001; as salt: D11969
- ChEMBL: ChEMBL4650319
- CompTox Dashboard (EPA): DTXSID201336749

Chemical and physical data
- Formula: C_{32}H_{39}N_{7}O_{4}
- Molar mass: 585.709 g·mol^{−1}
- 3D model (JSmol): Interactive image
- SMILES: CC(C)OC(=O)C1=CN=C(N=C1C2=CN(C3=CC=CC=C32)C)NC4=C(C=C(C(=C4)NC(=O)C=C)N(C)CCN(C)C)OC
- InChI: InChI=1S/C32H39N7O4/c1-9-29(40)34-24-16-25(28(42-8)17-27(24)38(6)15-14-37(4)5)35-32-33-18-22(31(41)43-20(2)3)30(36-32)23-19-39(7)26-13-11-10-12-21(23)26/h9-13,16-20H,1,14-15H2,2-8H3,(H,34,40)(H,33,35,36); Key:AZSRSNUQCUDCGG-UHFFFAOYSA-N; as salt: InChI=1S/C32H39N7O4.C4H6O4/c1-9-29(40)34-24-16-25(28(42-8)17-27(24)38(6)15-14-37(4)5)35-32-33-18-22(31(41)43-20(2)3)30(36-32)23-19-39(7)26-13-11-10-12-21(23)26;5-3(6)1-2-4(7)8/h9-13,16-20H,1,14-15H2,2-8H3,(H,34,40)(H,33,35,36);1-2H2,(H,5,6)(H,7,8); Key:YXYAEUMTJQGKHS-UHFFFAOYSA-N

Mobocertinib, sold under the brand name Exkivity, is used for the treatment of non-small cell lung cancer.

The most common side effects include diarrhea, rash, nausea, stomatitis, vomiting, decreased appetite, paronychia, fatigue, dry skin, and musculoskeletal pain.

Mobocertinib is a small molecule tyrosine kinase inhibitor structurally similar to osimertinib (differs only by the presence of an additional isopropyl ester group). Its molecular target is epidermal growth factor receptor (EGFR) bearing mutations in the exon 20 region. Mobocertinib is an irreversible kinase inhibitor, forming a covalent bond with the cysteine 797 in the EGFR active site, leading to sustained inhibition of EGFR enzymatic activity. The irreversible binding leads to increased potency via higher affinity binding, more sustained EGFR kinase activity inhibition, and greater overall selectivity, as only a limited number of other kinases possess a cysteine in the equivalent position.

Mobocertinib was approved for medical use in the United States in September 2021. It is a first-in-class oral treatment to target EGFR Exon20 insertion mutations. In July 2024, Takeda withdrew mobocertinib from the United States market after the drug's phase III trial, EXCLAIM-2, failed to meet its primary endpoint and did not meet the confirmatory requirements.

== Medical uses ==
Mobocertinib is indicated for adults with locally advanced or metastatic non-small cell lung cancer (NSCLC) with epidermal growth factor receptor (EGFR) exon 20 insertion mutations, as detected by an FDA-approved test, whose disease has progressed on or after platinum-based chemotherapy.

== Mechanism of action ==
Mobocertinib acts to inhibit EGFR exon 20 insertion mutations at a lower concentration than it does on wild-type proteins.

== Pharmacokinetics ==
The volume of distribution of Mobocertinib at steady state is 3,509 L. The mean oral bioavailability of Mobocertinib is 37%. The median Tmax is 4 hours. The average half-life of Mobocertinib and its metabolites is 18 hours. Mobocertinib is metabolized by CYP3A enzymes.

== Warnings ==
Mobocertinib may increase the chance of QTC prolongation, specifically Torsades de Pointes which can be fatal.

== Adverse effects ==
More serious side effects of Mobocertinib may include agitation, bloating of the eyes, lips, feet, blurred vision, coma, decreased urine output, headache, hostility, diarrhea, depression, dizziness, fainting, lethargy, anxiety, nausea, seizures, weight gain, fatigue as well as edema. Other side effects which may be less frequent are: chills, cough, dilated neck veins, ill-feeling and trouble with breathing. Other notable side effects of taking Mobocertinib are: having an acidic stomach, heartburn, acidity, hair loss/thinning, bone pain, sore throat, stuffy nose, trouble swallowing, vomiting and weakness in hands and feet.

== History ==
Mobocertinib was studied in participants with previously treated metastatic non-small cell lung cancer with EGFR exon 20 insertions.

The FDA granted the application for mobocertinib orphan drug designation.
