= PKIB =

Protein-coding gene in the species Homo sapiens

Identifiers
- Aliases: PKIB, PRKACN2, protein kinase (cAMP-dependent, catalytic) inhibitor beta, cAMP-dependent protein kinase inhibitor beta
- External IDs: OMIM: 606914; MGI: 101937; HomoloGene: 7474; GeneCards: PKIB; OMA:PKIB - orthologs

Gene location (Human)
Chr.	Chromosome 6 (human)
Band	6q22.31	Start	122,471,917 bp
Band	6q22.31	End	122,726,373 bp

Gene location (Mouse)
Chr.	Chromosome 10 (mouse)
Band	10 B4|10 29.22 cM	Start	57,508,077 bp
Band	10 B4|10 29.22 cM	End	57,617,208 bp
RNA expression pattern
Bgee	Human / Mouse (ortholog); Top expressed in: cerebellar vermis; mucosa of ileum; mucosa of transverse colon; cerebellar hemisphere; right hemisphere of cerebellum; rectum; mucosa of sigmoid colon; placenta; bronchial epithelial cell; pons / Top expressed in: seminiferous tubule; spermatid; olfactory epithelium; lumbar spinal ganglion; lobe of cerebellum; cerebellar vermis; suprachiasmatic nucleus; supraoptic nucleus; carotid body; pontine nuclei; More reference expression data
BioGPS	n/a
Gene ontology
Molecular function	protein kinase inhibitor activity; cAMP-dependent protein kinase inhibitor activity
Cellular component	cytoplasm; nucleus
Biological process	positive regulation of telomere maintenance via telomerase; positive regulation of telomere capping; positive regulation of telomerase activity; negative regulation of cAMP-dependent protein kinase activity; negative regulation of protein kinase activity
Sources:Amigo / QuickGO
Orthologs
Species	Human	Mouse
Entrez	5570	18768
Ensembl	ENSG00000135549	ENSMUSG00000019876
UniProt	Q9C010	Q04758
RefSeq (mRNA)	NM_001270393; NM_001270394; NM_001270395; NM_032471; NM_181794 NM_181795	NM_001039050; NM_001039051; NM_001039052; NM_001039053; NM_001190402 NM_008863
RefSeq (protein)	NP_001257322; NP_001257323; NP_001257324; NP_115860; NP_861459 NP_861460	n/a
Location (UCSC)	Chr 6: 122.47 – 122.73 Mb	Chr 10: 57.51 – 57.62 Mb
PubMed search
- Wikidata
View/Edit Human	View/Edit Mouse

cAMP-dependent protein kinase inhibitor beta is a protein that in humans is encoded by the PKIB gene.

The protein encoded by this gene is a member of the cAMP-dependent protein kinase inhibitor family. Studies of a similar protein in rat suggest that this protein may interact with the catalytic subunit of cAMP-dependent protein kinase and act as a competitive inhibitor. At least three alternatively spliced transcript variants encoding the same protein have been reported.
