= List of adverse effects of axitinib =

This is a list of adverse effects of the anti-cancer drug axitinib, sorted by frequency of occurrence.

== Very common ==
Very common (>10% incidence) adverse effects include:

- Underactive thyroid
- Decreased appetite
- Headache
- Dizziness
- Taste changes
- Haemorrhage
- High blood pressure
- Cough
- Shortness of breath
- Speech disorder
- Diarrhoea
- Nausea
- Vomiting
- Abdominal pain
- Stomatitis
- Indigestion
- Hand-foot syndrome
- Dry skin
- Rash
- Joint aches and pains
- Pain in the extremities
- Proteinuria
- Fatigue
- Asthenia
- Mucosal inflammation
- Weight loss

== Common ==
Common (1–10% incidence) adverse effects include:

- Anaemia
- Thrombocytopenia
- Hyperthyroidism
- TSH-increased
- Dehydration
- High blood potassium
- High blood calcium
- Ringing in the ears
- Venous embolic and thrombotic events
- Arterial embolic and thrombotic events
- Oropharyngeal pain
- Flatulence
- Haemorrhoids
- Glossodynia
- Hyperbilirubinaemia
- Itchiness
- Erythema
- Hair loss
- Myalgia
- Kidney failure
- Increased lipase
- Increases alanine aminotransferase
- Increased amylase
- Increased aspartate aminotransferase
- Increased alkaline phosphatase
- Increased creatinine

== Uncommon ==
Uncommon (0.1–1% incidence) adverse effects include:

- Gastrointestinal Perforation and fistula
- Reversible posterior leukoencephalopathy syndrome
- Polycythaemia
