= Zasocitinib =

Chemical compound

Identifiers
- IUPAC name: N-((1R,2R)-2-methoxycyclobutyl)-7-(methylamino)-5-{[2-oxo-1-(pyridin-2-yl)-1H-pyridin-3-yl]amino}pyrazolo[1,5-a]pyrimidine-3-carboxamide
- CAS Number: 2272904-53-5
- PubChem CID: 137441492
- ChemSpider: 115277123
- UNII: C293MNS6TQ
- KEGG: D12941
- ChEMBL: ChEMBL5314423

Chemical and physical data
- Formula: C_{23}H_{24}N_{8}O_{3}
- Molar mass: 460.498 g·mol^{−1}
- 3D model (JSmol): Interactive image
- SMILES: CNc1cc(Nc2cccn(-c3ccccn3)c2=O)nc2c(C(=O)N[C@@H]3CC[C@H]3OC)cnn12
- InChI: InChI=1S/C23H24N8O3/c1-24-20-12-18(27-16-6-5-11-30(23(16)33)19-7-3-4-10-25-19)29-21-14(13-26-31(20)21)22(32)28-15-8-9-17(15)34-2/h3-7,10-13,15,17,24H,8-9H2,1-2H3,(H,27,29)(H,28,32)/t15-,17-/m1/s1; Key:BWINBHTTZLVXGT-NVXWUHKLSA-N

Zasocitinib (TAK-279, NDI-034858) is a drug which is an orally active, highly selective, allosteric tyrosine kinase 2 (TYK2) inhibitor. It has been researched for various inflammatory conditions including psoriasis, psoriatic arthritis and Crohn's disease. It is significantly more selective than earlier compounds over side targets such as JAK1, which is hoped to give it an improved side effect profile.

== See also ==
- Deucravacitinib
