= Puma Biotechnology =

American biopharmaceutical company

- Traded as: Nasdaq: PBYI; Russell 2000 Component
- Headquarters: Los Angeles, United States
- Revenue: ▲$200.1 Million(2019)
- Number of employees: 265 (2019)
- Website: pumabiotechnology.com

Puma Biotechnology is a publicly traded biopharmaceutical company (NASDAQ: PBYI) headquartered in Los Angeles, CA.

== Creation ==
Puma was founded in September 2010 by Alan Auerbach to identify and in-license compounds that were already in clinical development. This was the same business plan Auerbach had followed at Cougar Biotechnology, which he founded in 2003, and through which he in-licensed abiraterone acetate from BTG plc. Cougar further developed abiraterone before the company was sold to Johnson & Johnson in 2009. Auerbach brought many Cougar employees with him after founding Puma in 2010.

== Funding for development ==
In August 2011 Puma licensed two drug candidates from Pfizer: neratinib (PB272) and an analog (PB357) to serve as a backup candidate.

As part of an approximately $60 million financing round in October 2011, Puma entered into a reverse merger with the shell company Innovative Acquisitions Corp., formed in 2007. In April 2012 the company's stock began trading over the counter. In October 2012 the company raised around $138 million and its shares were listed on the New York Stock Exchange.

In 2016 Puma discovered that Robert Gadimian, senior director of regulatory affairs, had twice bought and sold stock based on his knowledge of unpublished clinical trial results; Puma quickly fired him after conducting an internal investigation and reported the insider trading to the SEC.

== Approval and licensing of neratinib ==
In March 2016 Puma held a pre-NDA meeting with the FDA in which the FDA raised concerns about the design and conduct of clinical trials that Puma had run and recommended that Puma not file the NDA with that data.

Puma did file the NDA, and in May 2017 an FDA review panel recommended that the FDA approve neratinib but raised concerns that the intended use was too broad and should be limited to people with specific mutations. The FDA's briefing document to the panel had raised concerns about the marginal benefit of the drug and the side effects. In July 2017 the FDA approved neratinib for use in preventing the return of breast cancer after treatment that included trastuzumab and without any need for genetic testing, and with warnings about the risk of severe diarrhea. U.S. sales of neratinib totaled $200.5 million in 2018.

In January 2018 an EMA committee gave a negative review to neratinib. In June 2018 this same EMA committee recommended the approval of neratinib, which received European Commission (EC) approval in September 2018.

In 2019 Puma licensed commercialization rights in Europe and part of Africa to Pierre Fabre for an upfront payment of $60 million and milestone payments that could reach $345 million. Previously, Puma licensed rights in Greater China to CANbrdige Life Sciences, rights in Israel to Medison Pharma, rights in Canada to Knight Therapeutics, rights in South East Asian to Specialised Therapeutics and rights in Latin America to Pint Pharma.
