= Anti-apoptotic Ras signalling cascade =

Intracellular biological process

The Anti-apoptotic Ras signaling cascade is an intracellular signal transduction cascade that involves the Ras protein and inhibits apoptosis. It is the target of the cancer drug gefitinib.

It may refer to the PI3K/AKT pathway.

It may refer to the MAPK/ERK pathway which involves ras and can affect apoptosis.

The anti-apoptotic STAT pathway does not involve Ras.

== See also ==
- Ras subfamily
