= Mubritinib =

Chemical compound

Clinical data
- Routes of administration: Oral
- ATC code: none

Legal status
- Legal status: In general: uncontrolled

Identifiers
- IUPAC name: 1-(4-{4-[(2-{(E)-2-[4-(trifluoromethyl)phenyl]ethenyl}-1,3-oxazol-4-yl)methoxy]phenyl}butyl)-1H-1,2,3-triazole
- CAS Number: 366017-09-6
- PubChem CID: 6444692
- IUPHAR/BPS: 6011
- ChemSpider: 4948554
- UNII: V734AZP9BR
- ChEMBL: ChEMBL1614707
- CompTox Dashboard (EPA): DTXSID501026014

Chemical and physical data
- Formula: C_{25}H_{23}F_{3}N_{4}O_{2}
- Molar mass: 468.480 g·mol^{−1}
- 3D model (JSmol): Interactive image
- SMILES: FC(F)(F)c1ccc(cc1)\C=C\c2nc(co2)COc3ccc(cc3)CCCCn4nncc4
- InChI: InChI=1S/C25H23F3N4O2/c26-25(27,28)21-9-4-20(5-10-21)8-13-24-30-22(18-34-24)17-33-23-11-6-19(7-12-23)3-1-2-15-32-16-14-29-31-32/h4-14,16,18H,1-3,15,17H2/b13-8+; Key:ZTFBIUXIQYRUNT-MDWZMJQESA-N

Mubritinib (TAK-165) is a protein kinase inhibitor which was under development by Takeda for the treatment of cancer. It completed phase I clinical trials but appears to have been discontinued, as no new information on the drug has surfaced since December 2008.

== See also ==
- Protein kinase inhibitor
