= SU6656 =

Names
- IUPAC name (3Z)-N,N-Dimethyl-2-oxo-3-(4,5,6,7-tetrahydro-1H-indol-2-ylmethylidene)-2,3-dihydro-1H-indole-5-sulfonamide

Identifiers
CAS Number	330161-87-0
3D model (JSmol)	Interactive image
ChEMBL	ChEMBL605003
ChemSpider	4471568
IUPHAR/BPS	6044
PubChem CID	5312137
- InChI: InChI=1S/C19H21N3O3S/c1-22(2)26(24,25)14-7-8-18-15(11-14)16(19(23)21-18)10-13-9-12-5-3-4-6-17(12)20-13/h7-11,20H,3-6H2,1-2H3,(H,21,23)/b16-10-
- SMILES: O=S(=O)(c1cc\2c(cc1)NC(=O)C/2=C/c3cc4c([nH]3)CCCC4)N(C)C

Properties
Chemical formula	C_{19}H_{21}N_{3}O_{3}S
Molar mass	371.46 g·mol^{−1}
- Except where otherwise noted, data are given for materials in their standard state (at 25 °C [77 °F], 100 kPa). Infobox references

SU6656 is a Src family kinase inhibitor developed by the biotechnology company SUGEN Inc (a subsidiary of Pharmacia) in 2000. SU6656 was initially identified as a Src kinase inhibitor by virtue of its ability to reverse an effect that an activated mutant form of Src (hu SRC Y530F) has on the actin cytoskeleton, namely the formation of podosome rosettes, otherwise known as invadopodia. SU6656 was initially published as a Src family kinase inhibitor with selectivity relative to platelet-derived growth factor receptor tyrosine kinase. Subsequent studies have confirmed that SU6656 is relatively selective for Src family kinases, but some additional biochemical activities have been identified including: BRSK2, AMPK, Aurora C, Aurora B, CaMKKβ. The inhibition of these kinases in biochemical reactions in vitro does not necessarily indicate that these kinases are targets of SU6656 in cells.

SU6656 has been used primarily as a research tool to investigate the function of Src family kinases in cellular signal transduction processes and biology.
