= Streptomyces cocklensis =

Scientific classification
- Domain: Bacteria
- Kingdom: Bacillati
- Phylum: Actinomycetota
- Class: Actinomycetia
- Order: Streptomycetales
- Family: Streptomycetaceae
- Genus: Streptomyces
- Species: S. cocklensis

Binomial name
- Streptomyces cocklensis Kim et al. 2012

Type strain
- BK168, KACC 20908, NCIMB 14704

Species of bacterium

Streptomyces cocklensis is a bacterium species from the genus of Streptomyces which has been isolated from soil from the Cockle Park Experimental Farm in Northumberland in the United Kingdom. Streptomyces cocklensis produces dioxamycin.

== See also ==
- List of Streptomyces species
