= OSI Pharmaceuticals =

American pharmaceutical company

OSI Pharmaceuticals, Inc.
- Company type: Subsidiary
- Industry: Pharmaceutical
- Founded: 1983
- Headquarters: Melville, New York
- Key people: Colin Goddard, CEO; Michael G. Atieh, CFO; Robert A. Ingram, Chairman
- Products: Biopharmaceuticals; Biotherapeutics
- Revenue: ▲$375.7 MillionUSD (2006)
- Net income: ▲$-582.2 Million USD (2006)
- Number of employees: 554 (2007-02)
- Parent: Astellas Pharma (2010-present)

OSI Pharmaceuticals, Inc. was an American pharmaceutical company formerly based on Long Island, New York with facilities in Colorado, New Jersey and the United Kingdom. On Sunday, May 16, 2010 OSI agreed to be acquired by Japan-based, TSE-listed Astellas Pharma for $4.0 billion. The deal was closed on June 9, 2010. The company closed its last facilities on Long Island in May 2013. OSI had specialized in the discovery and development of molecular targeted therapies. Though oncology was the top priority for OSI, research and development targeting type 2 diabetes and obesity had been conducted through their U.K. subsidiary Prosidion Limited. OSI had also made a foray into the ophthalmology market through a marketing agreement with Pfizer over Macugen (Pegaptanib) for Age-related macular degeneration; however, acquisition of the firm Eyetech, meant to provide control over this product and diversify the company, was unsuccessful, ending in divestiture.

In mid-2007, OSI's revenues were based primarily on proceeds from Tarceva sales (which are shared with Genentech and Hoffmann–La Roche) and royalty payments related to dipeptidyl-peptidase IV inhibitor intellectual property.

== Tarceva ==
Tarceva (Erlotinib) was OSI's flagship and, as of 2007, only marketed product. Tarceva is a small molecule inhibitor of the epidermal growth factor receptor (EGFR) and is the only EGFR inhibitor to have demonstrated the ability to improve overall survival in advanced non-small cell lung cancer and advanced pancreatic cancer. Tarceva was discovered by Pfizer as CP-358774 (Moyer et al. Cancer Research, 1997, 57:4838), renamed OSI-774 when Pfizer was required to divest the compound in order to complete the buyout of Warner-Lambert/Parke-Davis and subsequently developed by OSI in conjunction with Genentech.

== See also ==
- Linsitinib (OSI-906), an inhibitor of IGF-1R in clinical trials for cancer treatment
