= Streptomyces xantholiticus =

Scientific classification
- Domain: Bacteria
- Kingdom: Bacillati
- Phylum: Actinomycetota
- Class: Actinomycetes
- Order: Streptomycetales
- Family: Streptomycetaceae
- Genus: Streptomyces
- Species: S. xantholiticus

Binomial name
- Streptomyces xantholiticus Pridham 1970

Type strain
- AS 4.1379, ATCC 27481, BCRC 12646, CBS 655.72, CCRC 12646, CGMCC 4.1379, CGMCC AS 4.1379, DSM 40244, IFO 13354, ISP 5244, JCM 4282, JCM 4863, KCC S-0282, KCC S-0863, KCCS-0282, KCCS-0863, Konev LIA 1130/12, KonevLIA1130/12, Lanoot R-8775, LIA 1130/12, LIA 17, LMG 19402, NBRC 13354, NCIB 9857, NCIMB 9857, NRRL B-12153, NRRL-ISP 5244, R-8775, RIA 1315, VKM Ac-1872, VTT E-011972

Synonyms
- Actinomyces xantholiticus

Species of bacterium

Streptomyces xantholiticus is a bacterium species from the genus of Streptomyces. Streptomyces xantholiticus produces xanthalycin A, xanthalycin B and pentaene.

== See also ==
- List of Streptomyces species
