= T790M =

Genetic variant

T790M, also known as Thr790Met, is a gatekeeper mutation of the epidermal growth factor receptor (EGFR). The mutation substitutes a threonine (T) with a methionine (M) at position 790 of exon 20, affecting the ATP binding pocket of the EGFR kinase domain. Threonine is a small polar amino acid; methionine is a larger nonpolar amino acid. Rather than directly blocking inhibitor binding to the active site, T790M increases the affinity for ATP so that the inhibitors are outcompeted; irreversible covalent inhibitors such as osimertinib can overcome this resistance.

== Clinical ==
Over 50% of acquired resistance to EGFR tyrosine kinase inhibitors (TKI) is caused by a mutation in the ATP binding pocket of the EGFR kinase domain involving substitution of a small polar threonine residue with a large nonpolar methionine residue, T790M.

In November 2015, the US FDA granted accelerated approval to osimertinib (Tagrisso) for the treatment of patients with metastatic epidermal growth factor receptor (EGFR) T790M mutation-positive non-small cell lung cancer (NSCLC), as detected by an FDA-approved test, which progressed on or after EGFR TKI therapy.
