= Perifolliculitis =

Inflammation of the skin around hair follicles

Perifolliculitis is the presence of inflammatory cells in the skin around the hair follicles. It is often found accompanying folliculitis, or inflammation of the hair follicle itself. It can have infectious or non-infectious causes.
