= Dacomitinib =

Drug for the treatment of lung carninoma

Clinical data
- Pronunciation: dak" oh mi' ti nib
- Trade names: Vizimpro
- Other names: PF-00299804
- AHFS/Drugs.com: Monograph
- MedlinePlus: a618055
- License data: US DailyMed: Dacomitinib
- Routes of administration: By mouth
- ATC code: L01EB07 (WHO)

Legal status
- Legal status: CA: ℞-only; US: ℞-only; EU: Rx-only; In general: ℞ (Prescription only)

Pharmacokinetic data
- Bioavailability: 80%
- Protein binding: 98%
- Metabolism: CYP2D6, CYP3A4
- Metabolites: O-desmethyl-dacomitinib
- Elimination half-life: 70 hrs
- Excretion: 79% faeces, 3% urine

Identifiers
- IUPAC name: (2E)-N-{4-[(3-Chloro-4-fluorophenyl)amino]-7-methoxy-6-quinazolinyl}-4-(1-piperidinyl)-2-butenamide
- CAS Number: 1110813-31-4
- PubChem CID: 11511120
- IUPHAR/BPS: 7422
- DrugBank: DB11963
- ChemSpider: 9685914
- UNII: 2XJX250C20
- KEGG: D09883; as salt: D10514
- ChEBI: CHEBI:132268
- ChEMBL: ChEMBL2105719
- PDB ligand: 1C9 (PDBe, RCSB PDB)
- CompTox Dashboard (EPA): DTXSID50149493

Chemical and physical data
- Formula: C_{24}H_{25}ClFN_{5}O_{2}
- Molar mass: 469.95 g·mol^{−1}
- 3D model (JSmol): Interactive image
- SMILES: COC1=C(C=C2C(=C1)N=CN=C2NC3=CC(=C(C=C3)F)Cl)NC(=O)/C=C/CN4CCCCC4
- InChI: InChI=1S/C24H25ClFN5O2/c1-33-22-14-20-17(24(28-15-27-20)29-16-7-8-19(26)18(25)12-16)13-21(22)30-23(32)6-5-11-31-9-3-2-4-10-31/h5-8,12-15H,2-4,9-11H2,1H3,(H,30,32)(H,27,28,29)/b6-5+; Key:LVXJQMNHJWSHET-AATRIKPKSA-N

Dacomitinib, sold under the brand name Vizimpro, is a medication for the treatment of non-small-cell lung carcinoma (NSCLC). It is a selective and irreversible inhibitor of EGFR.

Dacomitinib has advanced to several Phase III clinical trials. In January 2014, results of the first trials were disappointing, with a failure to meet the study goals, but additional Phase III trials continued. In 2017, results of a trial comparing dacomitinib to gefitinib for NSCLC (driven by mutated EGFR) were announced.

Dacomitinib was approved for medical use in the United States in September 2018, in Japan in 2019, and in the European Union in 2019; for the treatment of non-small cell lung cancer with epidermal growth factor receptor (EGFR) gene mutation.

== Synthesis ==
The commercial process for the synthesis of dacomitinib was recently reported by Pfizer. An overall yield of 58% is reported.

skin-invert-image

Catalytic hydrogenation of [1269400-04-5] (1) gave the aniline (2), which was used without purification for the next step. The reaction of methyl 4-bromocrotonate [6000-00-6] (3) with piperidine, followed by saponification of the ester gave (E)-4-(piperidin-1-yl)but-2-enoic acid [768341-84-0] (4). The amide formation between 2 & 4 was facilitated by T3P and 2,6-lutidine in acetonitrile. A reverse quench with aqueous NaOH was performed to minimize hydrolysis of the formamidine group to give PC156701138 (5). The intermediate underwent a Dimroth rearrangement in the presence of 3-chloro-4-fluoroaniline [367-21-5] (6) completing the synthesis of dacomitinib (7). It is worth noting that the intermediate as well as dacomitinib are unstable under the high temperatures typically used for Dimroth rearrangements (refluxing in HOAc). The reaction was optimized to occur at lower temperatures. The reaction was made to occur at 30 °C in neat acetic acid using two equivalents of aniline (6) to increase the reaction rate.
