= CYP3A5 =

Enzyme involved in drug metabolism

Identifiers
- Aliases: CYP3A5, CP35, CYPIIIA5, P450PCN3, PCN3, cytochrome P450 family 3 subfamily A member 5
- External IDs: OMIM: 605325; MGI: 106099; GeneCards: CYP3A5
Enzyme activity
| EC # | BRENDA | ExPASy | KEGG | MetaCyc |
|---|---|---|---|---|
| 1.14.14.1 | ↗ | ↗ | ↗ | ↗ |

Gene location (Human)
| Chr. | Chromosome 7 (human) |
| Band | 7q22.1 | Start | 99,648,194 bp |
| Band | 7q22.1 | End | 99,679,998 bp |

Gene location (Mouse)
| Chr. | Chromosome 5 (mouse) |
| Band | 5 G2|5 85.17 cM | Start | 145,373,119 bp |
| Band | 5 G2|5 85.17 cM | End | 145,406,533 bp |
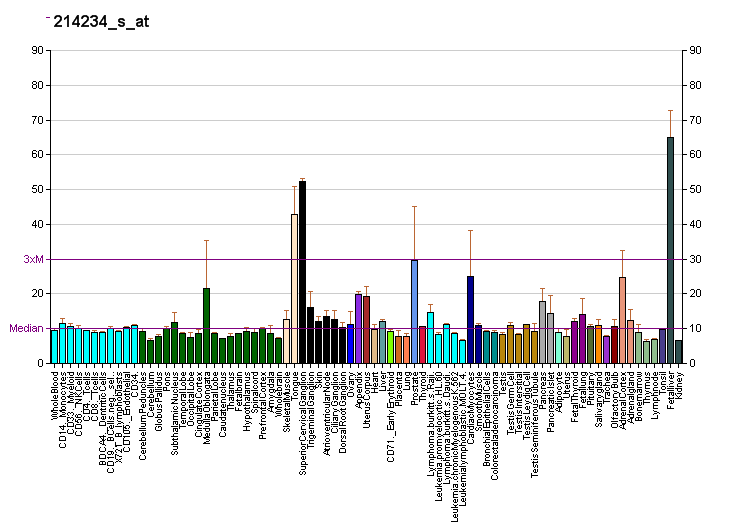

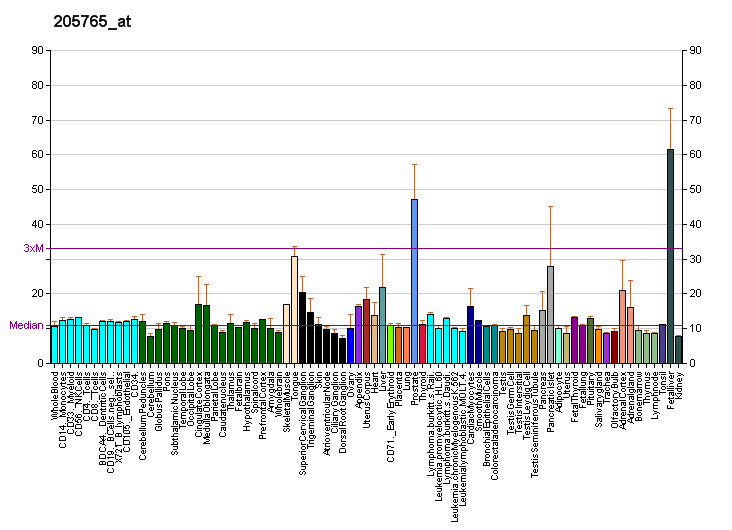
RNA expression pattern
| Bgee | Human / Mouse (ortholog); Top expressed in: jejunal mucosa; right lobe of liver; gallbladder; duodenum; rectum; mucosa of sigmoid colon; body of pancreas; buccal mucosa cell; pylorus; mucosa of transverse colon / Top expressed in: hepatobiliary system; liver; sexually immature organism; duodenum; muscle; human fetus; sensory nervous system; sensory organ; retina; muscle tissue; More reference expression data |
| BioGPS | More reference expression data |
Gene ontology
| Molecular function | iron ion binding; oxidoreductase activity; oxygen binding; aromatase activity; oxidoreductase activity, acting on paired donors, with incorporation or reduction of molecular oxygen, reduced flavin or flavoprotein as one donor, and incorporation of one atom of oxygen; heme binding; oxidoreductase activity, acting on paired donors, with incorporation or reduction of molecular oxygen; metal ion binding; monooxygenase activity; estrogen 16-alpha-hydroxylase activity |
| Cellular component | organelle membrane; endoplasmic reticulum membrane; intracellular membrane-bounded organelle; endoplasmic reticulum; membrane |
| Biological process | xenobiotic metabolic process; alkaloid catabolic process; oxidative demethylation; lipid hydroxylation; steroid metabolic process; estrogen metabolic process |
Sources:Amigo / QuickGO
Orthologs
| Databases | NCBI: entry; OMA: entry |
| Species | Human | Mouse |
| Entrez | 1577 | 13114 |
| Ensembl | ENSG00000106258 | ENSMUSG00000038656 |
| UniProt | P20815 | Q64481 |
| RefSeq (mRNA) | NM_000777; NM_001190484; NM_001291829; NM_001291830 | NM_007820 |
| RefSeq (protein) | NP_000768; NP_001177413; NP_001278758; NP_001278759 | NP_031846 |
| Location (UCSC) | Chr 7: 99.65 – 99.68 Mb | Chr 5: 145.37 – 145.41 Mb |
| PubMed search |
- Wikidata
| View/Edit Human | View/Edit Mouse |

Cytochrome P450 3A5 is a protein that in humans is encoded by the CYP3A5 gene.

== Tissue distribution ==
CYP3A5 encodes a member of the cytochrome P450 superfamily of enzymes. Like most of the cytochrome P450, the CYP3A5 is expressed in the prostate and the liver. It is also expressed in epithelium of the small intestine and large intestine for uptake and in small amounts in the bile duct, nasal mucosa, kidney, adrenal cortex, epithelium of the gastric mucosa with intestinal metaplasia, gallbladder, intercalated ducts of the pancreas, chief cells of the parathyroid and the corpus luteum of the ovary (at protein level).

== Clinical significance ==
The cytochrome P450 proteins are monooxygenases which catalyze many reactions involved in drug metabolism and synthesis of cholesterol, steroids and other lipids. This protein localizes to the endoplasmic reticulum and its expression is induced by glucocorticoids and some pharmacological agents. The enzyme metabolizes drugs such as nifedipine and cyclosporine as well as the steroid hormones testosterone, progesterone and androstenedione. This gene is part of a cluster of cytochrome P450 genes on chromosome 7q21.1. This cluster includes a pseudogene, CYP3A5P1, which is very similar to CYP3A5. This similarity has caused some difficulty in determining whether cloned sequences represent the gene or the pseudogene.

CYP3A4/3A5 are a group of heme-thiolate monooxygenases. In liver microsomes, this enzyme is involved in an NADPH-dependent electron transport pathway. It oxidizes a variety of structurally unrelated compounds, including steroids, fatty acids, and xenobiotics. Immunoblot analysis of liver microsomes showed that CYP3A5 is expressed as a 52.5-kD protein, whereas CYP3A4 migrates as a 52.0-kD protein. The human CYP3A subfamily, CYP3A4, CYP3A5, CYP3A7 and CYP3A43, is one of the most versatile of the biotransformation systems that facilitate the elimination of drugs (37% of the 200 most frequently prescribed drugs in the U.S.).

CYP3A4 and CYP3A5 together account for approximately 30% of hepatic cytochrome P450, and approximately half of medications that are oxidatively metabolized by P450 are CYP3A substrates. Both CYP3A4 and CYP3A5 are expressed in liver and intestine, with CYP3A5 being the predominant form expressed in extrahepatic tissues.

== Selective inhibition and therapeutic relevance ==
The (wild-type) CYP3A enzymes have traditionally been thought of as functionally redundant, distinguishable mostly by expression patterns. Since CYP3A5 is almost always expressed at significantly lower levels than CYP3A4, an understanding of its clinical significance was limited. Most studies suggesting any non-overlapping metabolic functions apart from CYP3A4 were limited to small differences in metabolites produced from drugs which themselves were still substrates of CYP3A4. However, in 2016 it was found that CYP3A5 mediated acquired drug resistance in pancreatic ductal adenocarcinoma, a type of pancreatic cancer. This not only showed a context of selective CYP3A5 expression, but also demonstrated a therapeutic need for selective CYP3A5 inhibition and hinted that its metabolic role was not completely redundant with CYP3A4. Indeed, chemical tools would soon after be developed which could demonstrate and probe the selective CYP3A5 metabolic activity.

In 2020, Wright et al. reported the first CYP3A5-selective inhibitor clobetasol propionate. The study demonstrated a strong inhibition of CYP3A5 and showed its high selectivity over other CYP3A enzymes including CYP3A4. It was proposed that clobetasol propionate differentially occupied the binding site of CYP3A5 compared to CYP3A4 (which would later become validated with subsequent studies).

== Allele distribution ==
The CYP3A5 gene has several functional variants, which vary depending on ethnicity. The CYP3A5*1 allele is associated with a normal metabolization of medication. It is most common among individuals native to Sub-Equatorial Africa, though the mutation also occurs at low frequencies in other populations. The CYP3A5*3 allele is linked with a poor metabolization of medication. It is near fixation in Europe, and is likewise found at high frequencies in West Asia and Central Asia, as well as among Afro-Asiatic (Hamitic-Semitic) speaking populations in North Africa and the Horn of Africa. Additionally, the mutation occurs at moderate-to-high frequencies in South Asia, Southeast Asia and East Asia, and at low frequencies in Sub-Equatorial Africa.

Global distribution of the CYP3A5 alleles:

| Population | CYP3A5*1 | CYP3A5*3 | CYP3A5*6 | CYP3A5*7 |
|---|---|---|---|---|
| Adygei | 12% | 88% | | |
| Afar | 35% | 65% | 18% | 0% |
| African Americans | 63% | 37% | 12% | 21% |
| Algerians (North) | 19% | 81% | 5% | 1% |
| Amhara | 33% | 67% | 15% | 0% |
| Anatolian Turks | 9% | 91% | 0% | 0% |
| Armenians (South) | 5% | 95% | 0% | 0% |
| Asante | 89% | 11% | 22% | 7% |
| Ashkenazi Jews | 3% | 97% | 0% | 0% |
| Balochi | 20% | 80% | | |
| Bantu (Kenya) | 83% | 17% | | |
| Bantu (South Africa) | 74% | 26% | 18% | 10% |
| Bantu (Uganda) | 96% | 4% | 22% | 21% |
| Basques (French) | 4% | 96% | | |
| Bedouin (Israel) | 17% | 83% | | |
| Berbers (Morocco) | 20% | 80% | 4% | 1% |
| Biaka Pygmies | 89% | 11% | | |
| Brahui | 12% | 88% | | |
| Britons (England and Scotland) | 35% | 65% | 0% | |
| Bulsa | 81% | 19% | 16% | 13% |
| Burusho | 22% | 78% | | |
| Cameroonian (Lake Chad) | 76% | 24% | 32% | 7% |
| Canadian Caucasians | 7% | 93% | 0% | 0% |
| Chagga | 74% | 26% | 14% | 9% |
| Chewa | 85% | 15% | 16% | 17% |
| Chinese | 25% | 75% | 0% | |
| Chinese (Denver, Colorado) | 25% | 75% | | |
| Colombians | 15% | 85% | | |
| Colombians (Medellian) | 48% | 52% | 2% | |
| Congolese (Brazzaville) | 80% | 20% | 12% | 9% |
| Dai | 45% | 55% | | |
| Druze | 8% | 92% | | |
| Daur | 15% | 85% | | |
| East Asian | 31% | 69% | 0% | 0% |
| European | 2% | 98% | 0% | 0% |
| Finns | 45% | 55% | 0% | |
| French | 8%-9% | 91%-92% | 0% | 0% |
| Gabonese | 79% | 21% | 19% | 19% |
| Gambians | 79% | 21% | 20% | 12% |
| Germans | 7% | 93% | | |
| Gujarati (Houston, Texas) | 25% | 75% | | |
| Han | 25% | 75% | | |
| Han (Beijing) | 28% | 72% | 0% | |
| Han (Southern) | 47% | 53% | 0% | |
| Hazara | 25% | 75% | | |
| Hezhen | 15% | 85% | | |
| Hispanic | 25% | 75% | 0% | 0% |
| Iberians | 39% | 61% | 0% | |
| Igbo | 87% | 13% | 18% | 9% |
| Indians | 41% | 59% | 0% | |
| Italians (Bergamo) | 18% | 82% | | |
| Italians (Sardinia) | 5% | 95% | | |
| Italians (Tuscany) | 5%-6% | 94%-95% | 0.5% | |
| Japanese | 23% | 77% | 0% | |
| Japanese (Tokyo) | 26% | 74% | 0.004% | |
| Kalash | 24% | 76% | | |
| Karitiana | 23% | 77% | | |
| Kasena | 78% | 22% | 17% | 13% |
| Khmer | 27% | 73% | | |
| Koreans | 19% | 81% | 0% | |
| Kotoko | 73% | 27% | 23% | 5% |
| Lahu | 25% | 75% | | |
| Lemba | 87% | 13% | 25% | 15% |
| Lomwe | 83% | 17% | 22% | 11% |
| Luhya (Webuye, Kenya) | 86% | 14% | 26% | |
| Maale | 51% | 49% | 15% | 1% |
| Maasai (Kinyawa, Kenya) | 51% | 49% | 14% | |
| Makrani | 14% | 86% | | |
| Malay | 39% | 61% | 0% | |
| Malawians | 79% | 21% | 14% | 14% |
| Mandenka | 69% | 31% | | |
| Manjak | 79% | 21% | 23% | 7% |
| Maya | 29% | 71% | | |
| Mayo Darle | 73% | 27% | 25% | 6% |
| Mbuti Pygmies | 93% | 7% | | |
| Melanesians | 18% | 82% | | |
| Mestizo (El Salvador and Nicaragua) | 24% | 76% | | |
| Mestizo (Ecuador) | 12% | 88% | | |
| Mexicans (Los Angeles) | 25% | 75% | 2% | |
| Miaozu | 35% | 65% | | |
| Mongola | 35% | 65% | | |
| Mozabite | 16% | 84% | | |
| Naxi | 28% | 72% | | |
| Ngoni | 89% | 11% | 33% | 6% |
| North American Caucasians | 9% | 90% | | |
| Orogen | 10% | 90% | | |
| Orcadians | 16% | 84% | | |
| Oromo | 35% | 65% | 14% | 0% |
| Papuans | 21% | 79% | | |
| Palestinians | 18% | 82% | | |
| Pathan | 12% | 88% | | |
| Pima | 54% | 46% | | |
| Puerto Ricans | 56% | 44% | 5% | |
| Russians | 8% | 92% | | |
| San (Namibia) | 93% | 7% | | |
| Sena | 84% | 16% | 23% | 16% |
| Sephardi Jews | 11% | 89% | 0% | 0% |
| She | 45% | 55% | | |
| Shewa Arabs | 60% | 40% | 22% | 7% |
| Shona | 22% | 78% | 22% | 10% |
| Sindhi | 18% | 82% | | |
| Somie (Cameroonian Grassfields) | 77% | 23% | 18% | 10% |
| Southern Sudanese | 76% | 24% | 33% | 3% |
| Spaniard | 9% | 91% | | |
| Sudanese (Northern) | 40% | 60% | 11% | 0% |
| Sudanese (Kordofan) | 55% | 45% | 20% | 2% |
| Surui | 17% | 83% | | |
| Swedes | 7% | 93% | 0% | 0% |
| Tanzanians | 81% | 19% | 19% | 12% |
| Tu | 10% | 90% | | |
| Tujia | 35% | 65% | | |
| Tunisian | 19% | 81% | 1% | 0% |
| Uygur | 5% | 95% | | |
| Wolof | 73% | 27% | 18% | 9% |
| Xibo | 22% | 78% | | |
| Yao people | 82% | 18% | 13% | 9% |
| Yakuts | 10% | 90% | | |
| Yemeni (Hadramaut) | 15% | 85% | 3% | 1% |
| Yemeni (Sena and Msila) | 42% | 58% | 12% | 3% |
| Yizu | 20% | 80% | | |
| Yoruba | 83%-94% | 6%-17% | 17%-75% | 0% |
| Zimbabweans (Mposi) | 84% | 16% | 16% | 19% |

== Interactive pathway map ==
Click on genes, proteins and metabolites below to link to respective articles. (Note: The interactive pathway map can be edited at WikiPathways: "IrinotecanPathway_WP229".)

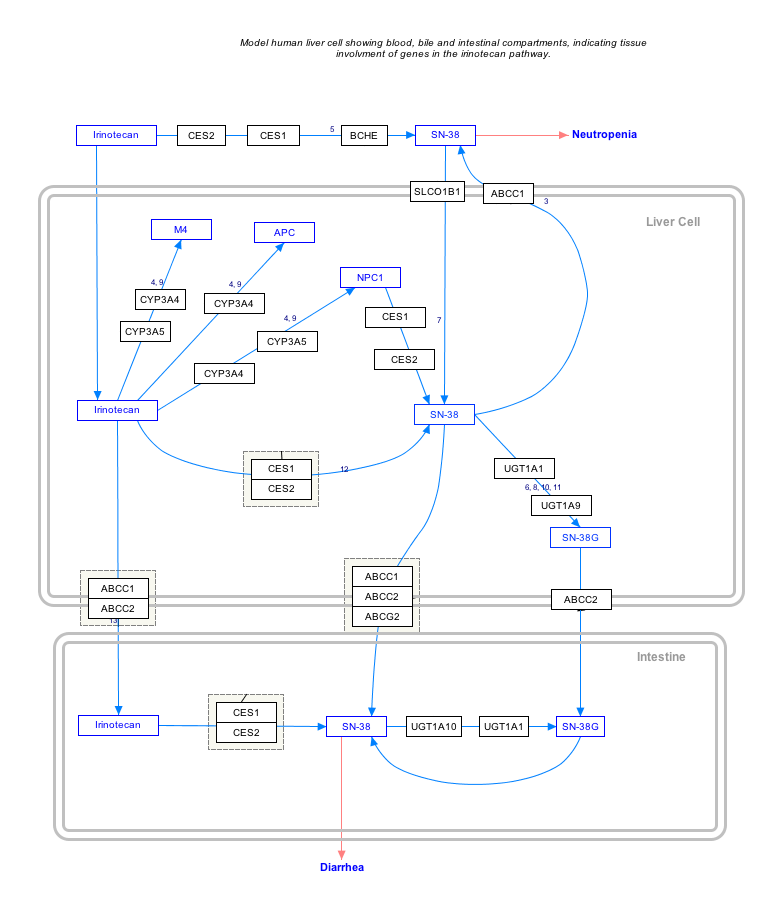

Irinotecan Pathway edit

== See also ==
- Cytochrome P450
