= Adavosertib =

Names
- Preferred IUPAC name 1-[6-(2-Hydroxypropan-2-yl)pyridin-2-yl]-6-[4-(4-methylpiperazin-1-yl)anilino]-2-(prop-2-en-1-yl)-1,2-dihydro-3H-pyrazolo[3,4-d]pyrimidin-3-one
- Other names AZD1775; MK-1775

Identifiers
CAS Number	955365-80-7
3D model (JSmol)	Interactive image
ChEBI	CHEBI:91414
ChEMBL	ChEMBL1976040
ChemSpider	24808590
ECHA InfoCard	100.205.373
IUPHAR/BPS	7702
KEGG	D11361
PubChem CID	24856436
UNII	K2T6HJX3I3
CompTox Dashboard (EPA)	DTXSID30241868
- InChI: InChI=1S/C27H32N8O2/c1-5-13-34-25(36)21-18-28-26(29-19-9-11-20(12-10-19)33-16-14-32(4)15-17-33)31-24(21)35(34)23-8-6-7-22(30-23)27(2,3)37/h5-12,18,37H,1,13-17H2,2-4H3,(H,28,29,31) Key: BKWJAKQVGHWELA-UHFFFAOYSA-N
- SMILES: CN1CCN(CC1)c2ccc(Nc3ncc4C(=O)N(CC=C)N(c5cccc(n5)C(C)(C)O)c4n3)cc2

Properties
Chemical formula	C_{27}H_{32}N_{8}O_{2}
Molar mass	500.607 g·mol^{−1}
- Except where otherwise noted, data are given for materials in their standard state (at 25 °C [77 °F], 100 kPa). Infobox references

Adavosertib (development codes AZD1775, MK-1775) is an experimental anti-cancer drug candidate. It is a small molecule inhibitor of the kinase enzyme WEE1. It is being developed by AstraZeneca. It is being investigated as a treatment for pancreatic cancer with a phase 1 trial (University of Michigan researchers are as of 2019 planning a phase 2 study.), and ovarian cancer, in combination with another anti-cancer drug, gemcitabine, as a phase 2 trial.
