= Lapatinib =

Cancer medication

Clinical data
- Trade names: Tykerb, Tyverb, others
- AHFS/Drugs.com: Monograph
- MedlinePlus: a607055
- License data: US DailyMed: Lapatinib
- Pregnancy category: AU: C
- Routes of administration: By mouth
- ATC code: L01EH01 (WHO)

Legal status
- Legal status: AU: S4 (Prescription only); CA: ℞-only; UK: POM (Prescription only); US: ℞-only; EU: Rx-only; In general: ℞ (Prescription only)

Pharmacokinetic data
- Bioavailability: Variable, increased with food
- Protein binding: >99%
- Metabolism: Liver, mostly CYP3A-mediated (minor 2C19 and 2C8 involvement)
- Elimination half-life: 24 hours (repeated dosing), 14.2 hours (single dose)
- Excretion: Mostly Feces

Identifiers
- IUPAC name: N-[3-Chloro-4-[(3-fluorophenyl)methoxy]phenyl]-6- [5-[(2-methylsulfonylethylamino)methyl]-2-furyl] quinazolin-4-amine
- CAS Number: 231277-92-2; as salt: 388082-78-8
- PubChem CID: 208908
- IUPHAR/BPS: 5692
- DrugBank: DB01259; as salt: DBSALT001785
- ChemSpider: 181006; as salt: 9731817
- UNII: 0VUA21238F; as salt: G873GX646R
- KEGG: D08108; as salt: D04024
- ChEBI: CHEBI:49603
- ChEMBL: ChEMBL554; as salt: ChEMBL1201179
- PDB ligand: FMM (PDBe, RCSB PDB)
- CompTox Dashboard (EPA): DTXSID7046675

Chemical and physical data
- Formula: C_{29}H_{26}ClFN_{4}O_{4}S
- Molar mass: 581.06 g·mol^{−1}
- 3D model (JSmol): Interactive image
- SMILES: CS(=O)(=O)CCNCc1ccc(o1)c2ccc3c(c2)c(ncn3)Nc4ccc(c(c4)Cl)OCc5cccc(c5)F
- InChI: InChI=1S/C29H26ClFN4O4S/c1-40(36,37)12-11-32-16-23-7-10-27(39-23)20-5-8-26-24(14-20)29(34-18-33-26)35-22-6-9-28(25(30)15-22)38-17-19-3-2-4-21(31)13-19/h2-10,13-15,18,32H,11-12,16-17H2,1H3,(H,33,34,35); Key:BCFGMOOMADDAQU-UHFFFAOYSA-N

Lapatinib (INN), used in the form of lapatinib ditosylate (USAN) (trade names Tykerb and Tyverb marketed by Novartis) is an orally active drug for breast cancer and other solid tumours. It is a dual tyrosine kinase inhibitor which interrupts the HER2/neu and epidermal growth factor receptor (EGFR) pathways. It is used in combination therapy for HER2-positive breast cancer. It is used for the treatment of patients with advanced or metastatic breast cancer whose tumors overexpress HER2 (ErbB2).

== Status ==
In March 2007, the U.S. Food and Drug Administration (FDA) approved lapatinib in combination therapy for breast cancer patients already using capecitabine (Xeloda). In January 2010, Tykerb received accelerated approval for the treatment of postmenopausal women with hormone receptor positive metastatic breast cancer that overexpresses the HER2 receptor and for whom hormonal therapy is indicated (in combination with letrozole).

Pharmaceutical company GlaxoSmithKline (GSK) markets the drug under the proprietary names Tykerb (mostly U.S.) and Tyverb (mostly Europe and Russia). The drug currently has approval for sale and clinical use in the US, Australia, Bahrain, Kuwait, Venezuela, Brazil, New Zealand, South Korea, Switzerland, Japan, Jordan, the European Union, Lebanon, India and Pakistan.

In August 2013, India's Intellectual Property Appellate Board revoked the patent for Glaxo's Tykerb citing its derivative status, while upholding at the same time the original patent granted for lapatinib.

The drug lapatinib ditosylate is classified as S/NM (a synthetic compound showing competitive inhibition of the natural product) that is naturally derived or inspired substrate.

== Mode of action ==
=== Biochemistry ===
Lapatinib inhibits the tyrosine kinase activity associated with two oncogenes, EGFR (epidermal growth factor receptor) and HER2/neu (human EGFR type 2). Over expression of HER2/neu can be responsible for certain types of high-risk breast cancers in women.

Like sorafenib, lapatinib is a protein kinase inhibitor shown to decrease tumor-causing breast cancer stem cells.

Lapatinib inhibits receptor signal processes by binding to the ATP-binding pocket of the EGFR/HER2 protein kinase domain, preventing self-phosphorylation and subsequent activation of the signal mechanism (see Receptor tyrosine kinase#Signal transduction).

=== Clinical application ===
==== Breast cancer ====
Lapatinib is used as a treatment for women's breast cancer in treatment-naïve, ER+/EGFR+/HER2+ breast cancer patients and in patients who have HER2-positive advanced breast cancer that has progressed after previous treatment with other chemotherapeutic agents, such as anthracycline, taxane-derived drugs, or trastuzumab (Herceptin).

A 2006 GSK-supported randomized clinical trial on female breast cancer previously being treated with those agents (anthracycline, a taxane and trastuzumab) demonstrated that administrating lapatinib in combination with capecitabine delayed the time of further cancer growth compared to regimens that use capecitabine alone. The study also reported that risk of disease progression was reduced by 51%, and that the combination therapy was not associated with increases in toxic side effects. The outcome of this study resulted in a somewhat complex and rather specific initial indication for lapatinib—use only in combination with capecitabine for HER2-positive breast cancer in women whose cancer have progressed following previous chemotherapy with anthracycline, taxanes and trastuzumab.

Early clinical trials have been performed suggesting that high dose intermittent lapatinib might have better efficacy with manageable toxicities in the treatment of HER2-overexpressing breast cancers.

== Adverse effects ==
Like many small molecule tyrosine kinase inhibitors, lapatinib is regarded as well tolerated. The most common side effects reported are diarrhea, fatigue, nausea and rashes. Of note, lapatinib related rash is associated with improved outcome. In clinical studies elevated liver enzymes have been reported. QT prolongation has been observed with the use of lapatinib ditosylate but there are no reports of torsades de pointes. Caution is advised in patients with hypokalaemia, hypomagnesaemia, congenital long QT syndrome, or with coadministration of medicines known to cause QT prolongation. In combination with capecitabine, reversible decreased left ventricular function are common (2%).

== Ongoing trials in gastric cancer ==
Phase III study designed to assess lapatinib in combination with chemotherapy for advanced HER2-positive gastric cancer in 2013 failed to meet the primary endpoint of improved overall survival (OS) against chemotherapy alone. The trial did not discover new safety signals, while the median OS for patients in the lapatinib and chemotherapy group was 12.2 months against 10.5 months for patients in the placebo plus chemotherapy. Secondary endpoints of the randomized, double-blinded study, were progression-free survival (PFS), response rate and duration of response. Median PFS was 6 months, response rate was 53% and the duration of response was 7.3 months in the investigational combination chemotherapy group compared to median PFS of 5.4 months, response rate of 39% and duration of response of 5.6 months for patients in chemotherapy alone group. Diarrhoea, vomiting, anemia, dehydration and nausea were serious adverse events (SAE) reported in over 2% of patients in the investigational combination chemotherapy group, while vomiting was the most common SAE noted in the chemotherapy group.
