= Tyrosine kinase inhibitor =

Drug typically used in cancer treatment

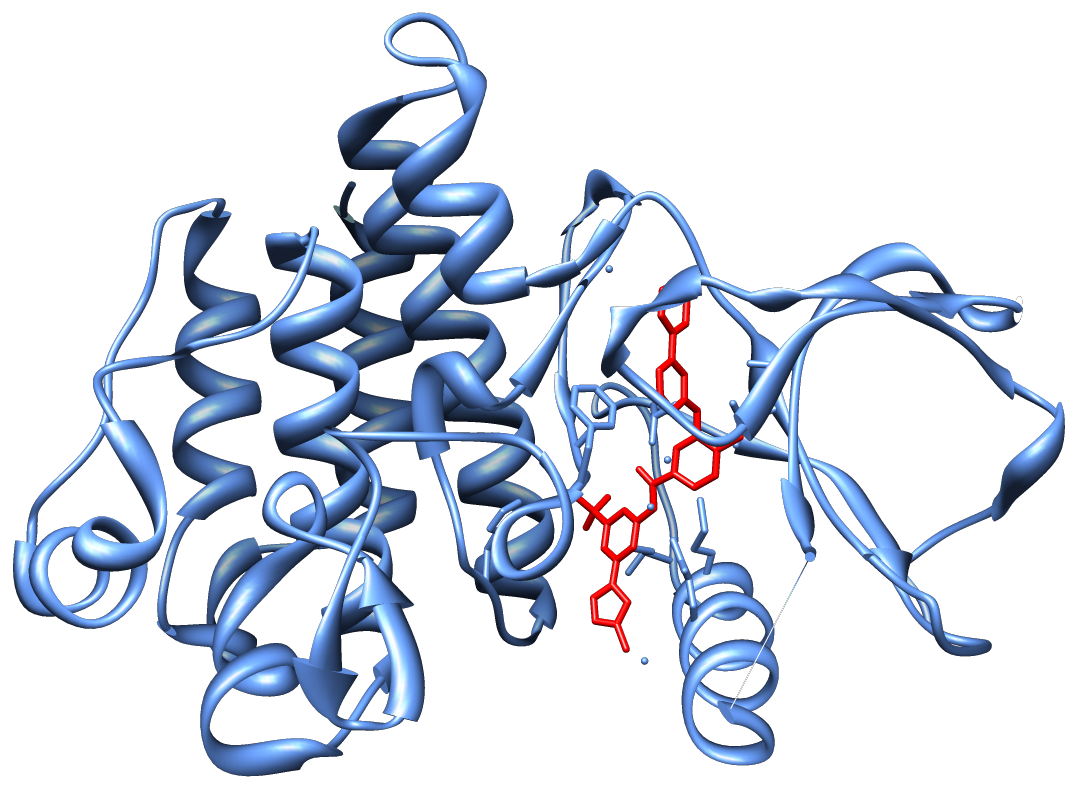
Crystal structure of the second generation Bcr-Abl tyrosine-kinase inhibitor nilotinib (red) in complex with an Abl kinase domain (blue). Nilotinib is used to treat chronic myelogenous leukemia (CML), a hematological malignancy.

A tyrosine kinase inhibitor (TKI) is a pharmaceutical drug that inhibits tyrosine kinases. Tyrosine kinases are enzymes responsible for the activation of many proteins by signal transduction cascades. The proteins are activated by adding a phosphate group to the protein (phosphorylation), a step that TKIs inhibit. TKIs are typically used as anticancer drugs. For example, they have substantially improved outcomes in chronic myelogenous leukemia. They have also been used to treat other diseases, such as idiopathic pulmonary fibrosis.

They are also called tyrphostins, the short name for "tyrosine phosphorylation inhibitor", originally coined in a 1988 publication, which was the first description of compounds inhibiting the catalytic activity of the epidermal growth factor receptor (EGFR).

The 1988 study was the first demonstration of a systematic search and discovery of small-molecular-weight inhibitors of tyrosine phosphorylation, which do not inhibit protein kinases that phosphorylate serine or threonine residues and can discriminate between the kinase domains of the EGFR and that of the insulin receptor. It was further shown that in spite of the conservation of the tyrosine-kinase domains one can design and synthesize tyrphostins that discriminate between even closely related protein tyrosine kinases such as EGFR and its close relative HER2.

== Development of drugs ==
Numerous TKIs aiming at various tyrosine kinases have been generated by the originators of these compounds and proven to be effective anti-tumor agents and anti-leukemic agents. Based on this work imatinib was developed against chronic myelogenous leukemia (CML) and later gefitinib and erlotinib aiming at the EGF receptor. Dasatinib is a Src tyrosine kinase inhibitor that is effective both as a senolytic and as therapy for CML.

Sunitinib, an inhibitor of the receptors for FGF, PDGF and VEGF is also based on early studies on TKIs aiming at VEGF receptors.

Adavosertib is a Wee1 kinase inhibitor that is undergoing numerous clinical trials in the treatment of refractory solid tumors. However, toxicities such as myelosuppression, diarrhea, and supraventricular tachyarrhythmia have arisen while attempting to determine the toxicity and effectiveness of the drug.

Lapatinib, FDA-approved for treatment in conjunction with chemotherapy or hormone therapy, is also currently undergoing clinical trials in the treatment of HER2-overexpressing breast cancers as it is suggested intermittent high-dose therapy might have better efficacy with manageable toxicity than the standard continuous dosing. A Phase I clinical trial found responses and dramatic responses to this line of treatment, with the most common toxicity being diarrhea.

Imatinib, sunitinib, sorafenib, and pazopanib have been studied in the treatment of aggressive fibromatosis (desmoid tumor).

The first tyrosine kinase 2 inhibitor drug, Sotyktu (deucravacitinib) was approved in 2022. A second TK2 inhibitor, zasocitinib, was under development as of 2026. Among failed TK2 inhibitor development programs was VTX958, ended in 2024.

== Mechanisms ==
TKIs operate by four different mechanisms: they can compete with adenosine triphosphate (ATP), the phosphorylating entity, the substrate or both or can act in an allosteric fashion, namely bind to a site outside the active site, affecting its activity by a conformational change. Recently TKIs have been shown to deprive tyrosine kinases of access to the Cdc37-Hsp90 molecular chaperone system on which they depend for their cellular stability, leading to their ubiquitylation and degradation. Signal transduction therapy can also be used for non-cancer proliferative diseases and for inflammatory conditions. An example is nintedanib for the treatment of idiopathic pulmonary fibrosis.

== See also ==
- Bcr-Abl tyrosine-kinase inhibitor
- Protein kinase inhibitor
