= Enzyme-linked receptor =

Class of enzymes

An enzyme-linked receptor, also known as a catalytic receptor, is a transmembrane receptor, where the binding of an extracellular ligand causes enzymatic activity on the intracellular side. Hence a catalytic receptor is an integral membrane protein possessing both catalytic, and receptor functions.

They have two important domains, an extra-cellular ligand binding domain and an intracellular domain, which has a catalytic function; and a single transmembrane helix. The signaling molecule binds to the receptor on the outside of the cell and causes a conformational change on the catalytic function located on the receptor inside the cell.

Examples of the enzymatic activity include:

- Receptor tyrosine kinase, as in fibroblast growth factor receptor. Most enzyme-linked receptors are of this type.
- Serine/threonine-specific protein kinase, as in bone morphogenetic protein
- Guanylate cyclase, as in atrial natriuretic factor receptor

== Types ==
The following is a list of the five major families of catalytic receptors:

Family	Member	Gene	Catalytic activity	Endogenous ligands	Synthetic ligands
Erb	ErbB1 (epidermal growth factor receptor)	EGFR	tyrosine kinase EC 2.7.10.1	Epidermal growth factor, amphiregulin, betacellulin, epigen, epiregulin, HB-EGF, TGFa	GW583340, gefitinib, erlotinib, tyrphostins AG879 and AG1478
Erb	ErbB2	ERBB2	"		
Erb	ErbB3	ERBB3	"	NRG-1, NRG-2	GW583340, gefitinib, erlotinib, tyrphostins AG879 and AG1478
Erb	ErbB4	ERBB4	"	Betacellulin, epiregulin, HB-EGF, NRG-1, NRG-2, NRG-3, NRG-4	GW583340, gefitinib, erlotinib, tyrphostins AG879 and AG1478
GDNF (glial cell-derived neurotrophic factor)	GFRa1	GFRa1	"	GDNF > neurturin > artemin	
GDNF (glial cell-derived neurotrophic factor)	GFRa2	GFRa2	"	Neurturin > GDNF	
GDNF (glial cell-derived neurotrophic factor)	GFRa3	GFRa3	"	Artemin	
GDNF (glial cell-derived neurotrophic factor)	GFRa4	GFRa4	"	Persephin	
NPR (natriuretic peptide receptor)	NPR1	NPR1	guanylyl cyclase EC 4.6.1.2	Atrial natriuretic peptide	
NPR (natriuretic peptide receptor)	NPR2	NPR2	"	C-type natriuretic peptide	
NPR (natriuretic peptide receptor)	NPR3	NPR3	"	Atrial natriuretic peptide	
NPR (natriuretic peptide receptor)	NPR4	NPR4	"	Uroguanylin	
trk neurotrophin receptor	TrkA	NTRK1	tyrosine kinase EC 2.7.10.1	Nerve growth factor > NT-3	GW441756, tyrphostin AG879
trk neurotrophin receptor	TrkB	NTRK2	"	Brain-derived neurotrophic factor, NT-4/NT-5 > NT-3	
trk neurotrophin receptor	TrkC	NTRK3	"	NT-3	
trk neurotrophin receptor	p75	NGFR	"	NGF, BDNF, NT3, NT4/5	
Toll-like	TLR1	TLR1	"		
Toll-like	TLR2	TLR2	"	Peptidoglycan	
Toll-like	TLR3	TLR3	"	polyIC, polyinosine-polycytosine	
Toll-like	TLR4	TLR4	"	LPS, lipopolysaccharide derived from Gram-negative bacteria	
Toll-like	TLR5	TLR5	"	Flagellin	
Toll-like	TLR6	TLR6	"		
Toll-like	TLR7	TLR7	"		resiquimod, imiquimod
Toll-like	TLR8	TLR8	"		
Toll-like	TLR9	TLR9	"	CpG, DNA enriched in cytosine:guanosine pairs	
Toll-like	TLR10	TLR10	"		
