= GAS1 =

Protein-coding gene in the species Homo sapiens

Identifiers
- Aliases: GAS1, growth arrest specific 1
- External IDs: OMIM: 139185; MGI: 95655; HomoloGene: 1548; GeneCards: GAS1; OMA:GAS1 - orthologs

Gene location (Human)
Chr.	Chromosome 9 (human)
Band	9q21.33	Start	86,944,362 bp
Band	9q21.33	End	86,947,506 bp

Gene location (Mouse)
Chr.	Chromosome 13 (mouse)
Band	13 B2|13 31.92 cM	Start	60,322,219 bp
Band	13 B2|13 31.92 cM	End	60,325,179 bp
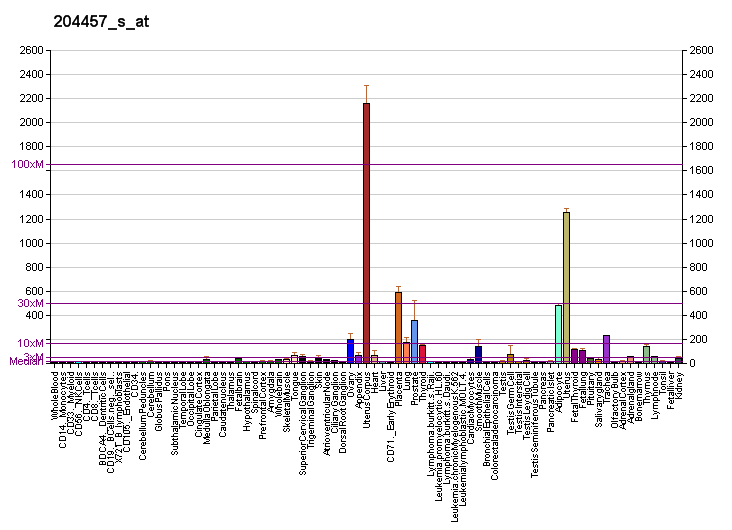

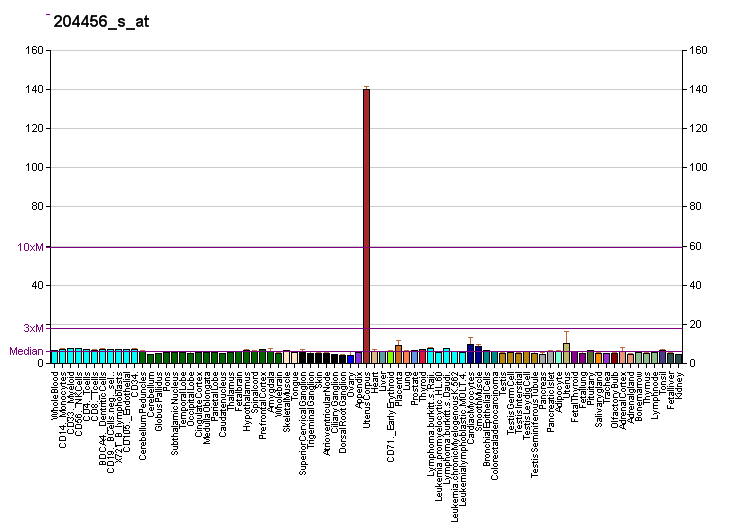
RNA expression pattern
Bgee	Human / Mouse (ortholog); Top expressed in: germinal epithelium; decidua; parietal pleura; pericardium; synovial joint; superficial temporal artery; glomerulus; lactiferous duct; tail of epididymis; metanephric glomerulus / Top expressed in: ciliary body; vestibular membrane of cochlear duct; ankle; vestibular sensory epithelium; umbilical cord; vas deferens; iris; efferent ductule; abdominal wall; utricle; More reference expression data
BioGPS	More reference expression data
Gene ontology
Molecular function	protein binding
Cellular component	integral component of membrane; anchored component of plasma membrane; plasma membrane; anchored component of membrane; membrane
Biological process	regulation of apoptotic process; regulation of smoothened signaling pathway; cell cycle; negative regulation of protein processing; cellular response to vascular endothelial growth factor stimulus; cell fate commitment; regulation of ER to Golgi vesicle-mediated transport; developmental growth; negative regulation of mitotic cell cycle
Sources:Amigo / QuickGO
Orthologs
Species	Human	Mouse
Entrez	2619	14451
Ensembl	ENSG00000180447	ENSMUSG00000052957
UniProt	P54826	Q01721
RefSeq (mRNA)	NM_002048	NM_008086
RefSeq (protein)	NP_002039	NP_032112
Location (UCSC)	Chr 9: 86.94 – 86.95 Mb	Chr 13: 60.32 – 60.33 Mb
PubMed search
- Wikidata
View/Edit Human	View/Edit Mouse

Growth arrest-specific protein 1 is a protein that in humans is encoded by the GAS1 gene.

== Function ==
Growth arrest-specific 1 plays a role in growth suppression. GAS1 blocks entry to S phase and prevents cycling of normal and transformed cells. Gas1 is a putative tumor suppressor gene.

== Discovery ==
The mouse cells, which appear the growth-arrested, were observed expression of Growth Arrest Specific-1 gene (GAS1). In 1988, Gas-1 was first defined as one of six genes that block transcriptional up-regulation of the NIH3T3 cell cycle from G0 to S phase. Most of scientist have proved that overexpressed gas1 has the function of inhibiting tumor growth and progression in gliomas. Furthermore, GAS1 gene was also thought to contribute to recurrence and metastasized prediction in colon cancer.

== Gene location of GAS1 ==
GAS-1 gene has been identified as a putative tumor suppressor collocates on chromosome 9q21.3-22.1 where was considered to be a fragile site. In 1994, 29 metaphases were analyzed by Del Sal et al, and 102 fluorescent signals were observed during the experiment. The results showed that 84 (82%) expression rate of the fluorescent signal on chromosome 9. Furthermore, the peak signal density of the fluorescent also observed occurring in the q21.3-22.1 region. In addition, the inexpression of the fluorescent signal cluster on any other chromosome further demonstrates Gas1 gene specifically expresses on chromosome 9q21.3-22.1.

== GAS1 characteristic ==
345 amino acids were confirmed to constitute mature Gas-1 gene. Asn117 and an aminated Ser318 are two particular position which result in discovering of the one N-glycosylation site and potential signal peptide, respectively.

=== Gene structure ===
Gas-1 gene has been confirmed to be highly similar to the GFRα1 gene (28% similarity) while the Gas1 only consists of two domains which is different from the GFRα1-3 that composes of three domains. Although the structure of GAS1 gene is similar to GFRαs, the function of GAS1 is largely different from GFRαs since the GAS 1 gene has the ability of binding RET in a ligand independent manner. Since the structure similarity between GAS1 and GFRαs, the ancestor of GFRα proteins was suspected to be the GAS1. In regard to the secondary structure, most of mammalian Gas1 gene’s secondary structure were identified to be mostly α-helical and to have a long unstructured C-terminal domain

== Gene expression ==
GAS1 protein widespread distributed in adult mammalian CNS ( central nervous system). Adult mouse brain has been described expressing GAS1 mRNA, and the experiment of Natanael Zarco et al further corroborated this description. Western blot analysis is the main method which has been used in their practical and plays a significant role in successfully determining the distribution of the protein in the adult central nervous system (CNS). Olfactory bulb, caudate-putamen, cerebral cortex, hippocampus, mesencephalon, medulla oblongata, cerebellum, and cervical spinal cord has been identified as the specific expression parts of GAS1. Despite the pattern of expression in Astrocyte cells was more limited than in neurons, the gas1 was also found expressing in that part.

== Function ==
GAS1 was identified as a pleiotropic protein with the function of cell arrest and apoptosis. GAS1 can induce intrinsic apoptosis; this pathway does not involve the activity of caspase 8. GAS1 accomplishes this by inhibiting GDNF-induced phosphorylation of RET, which leads to decreased phosphorylation of AKT; this decrease facilitates the dephosphorylation of BAD, which triggers the release of cytochrome c from the mitochondria and subsequent formation of the apoptosome, ultimately resulting in apoptosis.

Except that, the nervous system and other amount of organs can also be largely influenced by the abnormal Gas1 gene. The reason of this dual function is likely caused by its ability of interacting with the inhibited signaling cascade which induced by GNDF (glial cell-line derived neurotrophic factor). Additionally, GAS1 has been proved can largely influence the developmental state of the organs. During the development stage of the GAS1, it has been suggested that development GAS1 can not only inhibit cell proliferation but also control the cell death as well as growth of the cerebellum. The signal emission of GAS 1 protein associate with two different types of transmembrane receptor protein, including RET and the Hedgehog receptor protein, GAS1 is therefore determined as a kind of multifunctional protein. The Hedgehog signaling pathway is known as an essential part in the body which largely influences the body development, and cancer progression since the Sonic hedgehog can be connected by GAS1 directly, and lead to active of the signaling pathway.

=== Associated diseases ===
==== Kidney hypoplasia ====
The GAS1 gene plays a significant role in kidney development. Conserved DNA binding motif, which is located in the Gas1 promoter, is directly bind by the WT1, and then the Gas1 mRNA is activated to transcript to the NPCs. The WT1 has been confirmed as a necessary part for expressing Gas1 in kidneys in vivo. Loss of function of GAS1 in vivo results in hypoplastic kidneys with reduced nephron mass due to premature depletion of NPCs. In humans, fetal period is the most significant time point for inducting a new nephrons, no matter what kind of mammals, once the NPCS disappeared, there is no possibility for inducing the new nephrons.

== Gene mutation ==
Gas1 gene has been mapped by the method of in situ hybridization to human chromosome bands 9q21.3-q22, a fragile site where frequently deleted in human tumors, especially acute myeloid leukemia and bladder tumors. The deletion region of early superficial bladder cancer indicated that the frequent (50%) deletion of tumor suppressor genes was located between 9q22 and 9p12-13, an area that spanned the GAS1 gene position and could be a starting event for bladder cancer disease. However, a study that has been done by Simoneau et al indicates that there is no mutations in the gas1 gene in 14 primary bladder carcinomas and 10 bladder carcinoma cell lines, which means the mutation of gas1 is not the main reason in causing the pathogenesis.
