= GFRα =

Glial cell line-derived neurotrophic factor receptor

Identifiers
- Symbol: GFRα
- Pfam: PF02351
- InterPro: IPR003438
- Membranome: 44
Available protein structures:
- PDB: IPR003438 PF02351 (ECOD; PDBsum)
- AlphaFold: IPR003438; PF02351

The GDNF family receptor-α (GFRα) proteins are a group of co-receptors which form complexes with GDNF-family ligands (GFLs) to activate RET, the receptor of the GFLs. The GFRα co-receptors include the following:

- GFRα1 – preference for GDNF
- GFRα2 – preference for neurturin
- GFRα3 – preference for artemin
- GFRα4 – preference for persephin
- GFRAL - receptor for GDF15
