= GDNF family of ligands =

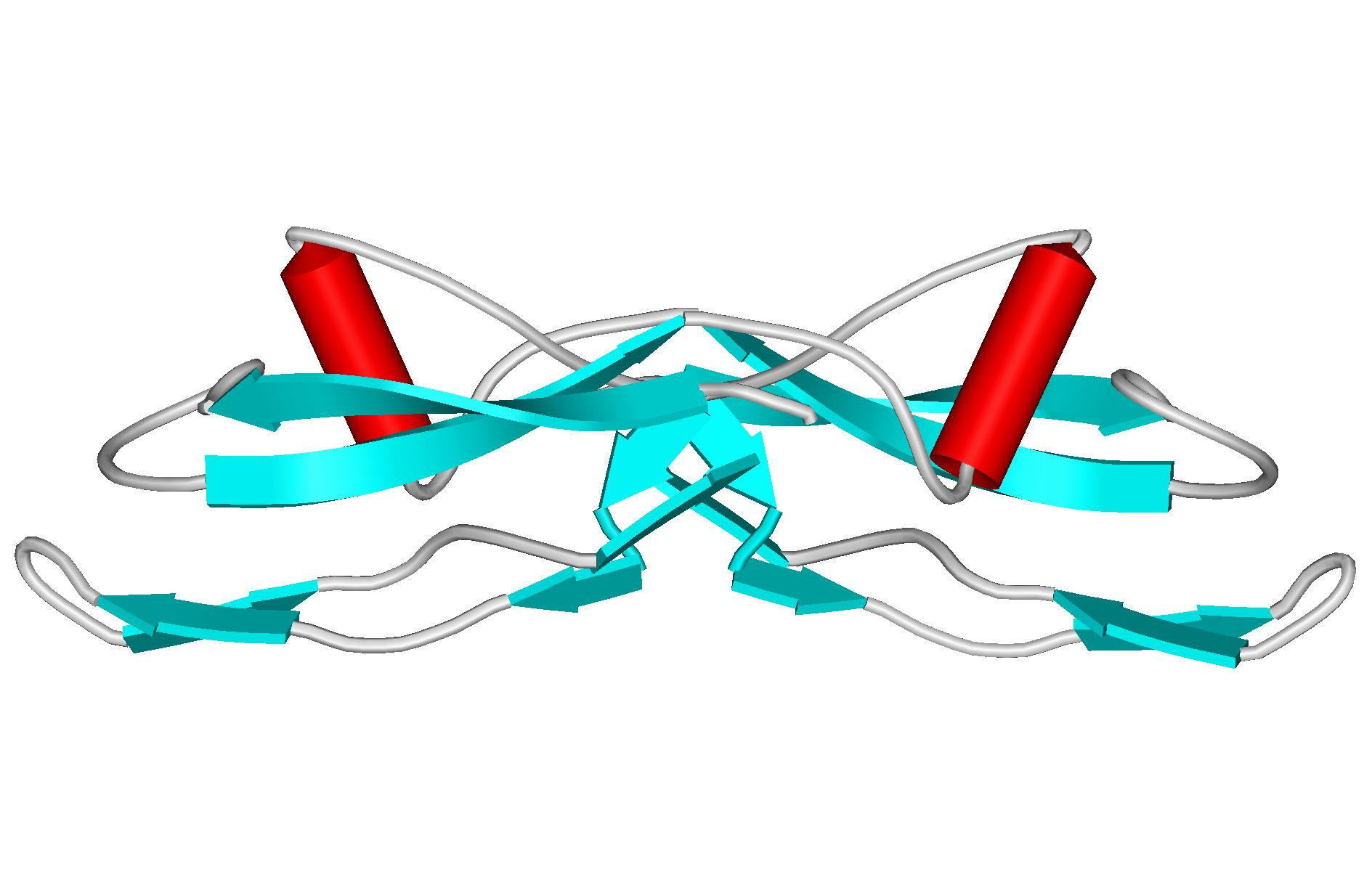
A 3D structure of GDNF

The GDNF family of ligands (GFL) consists of four neurotrophic factors: glial cell line-derived neurotrophic factor (GDNF), neurturin (NRTN), artemin (ARTN), and persephin (PSPN). GFLs have been shown to play a role in a number of biological processes including cell survival, neurite outgrowth, cell differentiation and cell migration. In particular signalling by GDNF promotes the survival of dopaminergic neurons.

== Signalling complex formation ==
At the cell surface of target cells, a signalling complex forms, composed of a particular GFL dimer, a receptor tyrosine kinase molecule RET, and a cell surface-bound co-receptor that is a member of the GFRα protein family. The primary ligands for the co-receptors GFRα1, GFRα2, GFRα3, and GFRα4 are GDNF, NRTN, ARTN, and PSPN, respectively. Upon initial GFL-GFRα complex formation, the complex then brings together two molecules of RET, triggering trans-autophosphorylation of specific tyrosine residues within the tyrosine kinase domain of each RET molecule. Phosphorylation of these tyrosines then initiates intracellular signal transduction processes.

It has been shown that in the case of GDNF, heparan sulfate glycosaminoglycans are also required to be present at the cell surface in order for RET mediated GDNF signalling to occur.

== Clinical significance ==
GFLs are an important therapeutic target for several conditions:

- GDNF has shown promising results in two Parkinson's disease clinical trials and in a number of animal trials. Although a different study later reported this as a 'placebo effect', work on perfecting the delivery of GDNF to the putamen is continuing. GDNF is a potent survival factor for central motoneurons and may have clinical importance for the treatment of ALS. Moreover, recent results highlight the importance of GDNF as a new target for drug addiction and alcoholism treatment.
- NRTN can also be used for Parkinson’s disease therapy and for epilepsy treatment. NRTN promotes survival of basal forebrain cholinergic neurons and spinal motor neurons. Therefore, NRTN has a potential in the treatment of Alzheimer’s disease and ALS.
- ARTN also has a therapeutic perspective, for it is considered for chronic pain treatment.
- PSPN promotes the survival of mouse embryonic basal forebrain cholinergic neurons in vitro. Hence, PSPN may be used for the treatment of Alzheimer’s disease. PSPN may also have clinical applications in the treatment of the stroke.

Given a huge spectrum of possible therapeutic applications, the modulation of GFRα/RET receptor complex activity is of great interest. However, natural GDNF ligands are of a limited clinical use. As positively charged polypeptides GFLs are unable to penetrate the blood–brain barrier, and they have very small volume of distribution in the tissues. Therefore, the creation of small-molecule agonists is highly beneficial for the development of effective therapies against devastating neurological diseases.
