= Zeteletinib =

Chemical compound

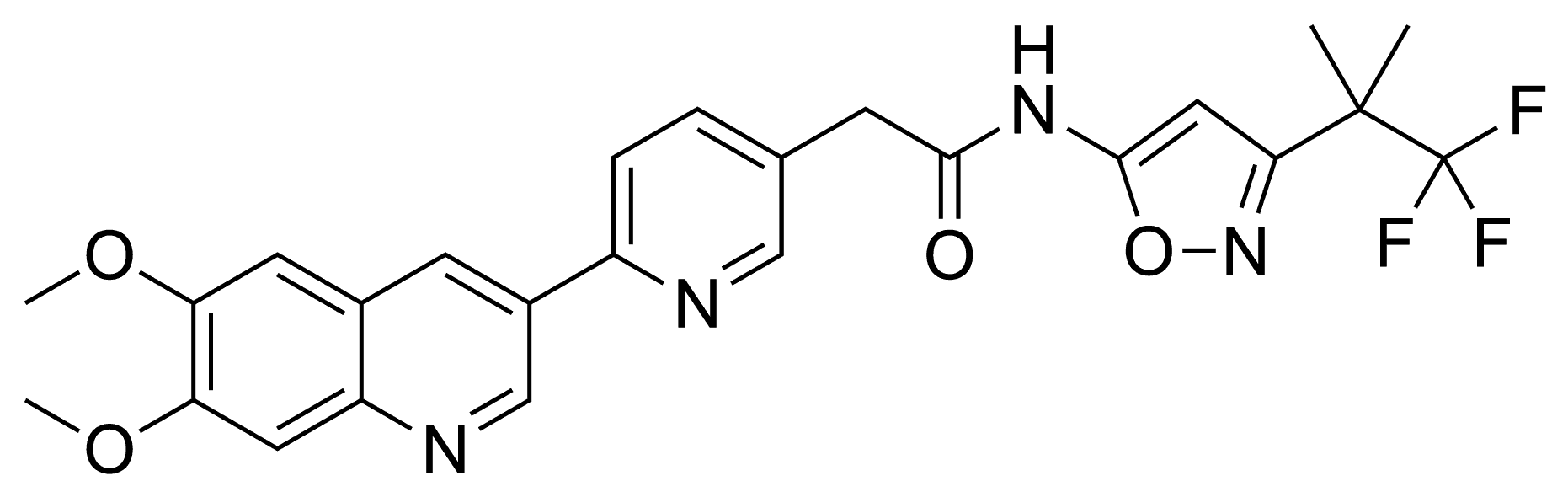

Identifiers
- IUPAC name: 2-[6-(6,7-dimethoxyquinolin-3-yl)pyridin-3-yl]-N-[3-(1,1,1-trifluoro-2-methylpropan-2-yl)-1,2-oxazol-5-yl]acetamide
- CAS Number: 2216753-97-6
- PubChem CID: 134391533
- ChemSpider: 115007145
- UNII: EP0P7SHM0U
- ChEMBL: ChEMBL5095497

Chemical and physical data
- Formula: C_{25}H_{23}F_{3}N_{4}O_{4}
- Molar mass: 500.478 g·mol^{−1}
- 3D model (JSmol): Interactive image
- SMILES: CC(C)(C1=NOC(=C1)NC(=O)CC2=CN=C(C=C2)C3=CN=C4C=C(C(=CC4=C3)OC)OC)C(F)(F)F
- InChI: InChI=1S/C25H23F3N4O4/c1-24(2,25(26,27)28)21-11-23(36-32-21)31-22(33)7-14-5-6-17(29-12-14)16-8-15-9-19(34-3)20(35-4)10-18(15)30-13-16/h5-6,8-13H,7H2,1-4H3,(H,31,33); Key:KOLQINCWMXQEOF-UHFFFAOYSA-N

Zeteletinib (BOS-172738, DS-5010) is an experimental anticancer medication which acts as a RET inhibitor.

== See also ==
- Enbezotinib
- Pralsetinib
- Rebecsinib
- Resigratinib
- Selpercatinib
