= Enbezotinib =

Chemical compound

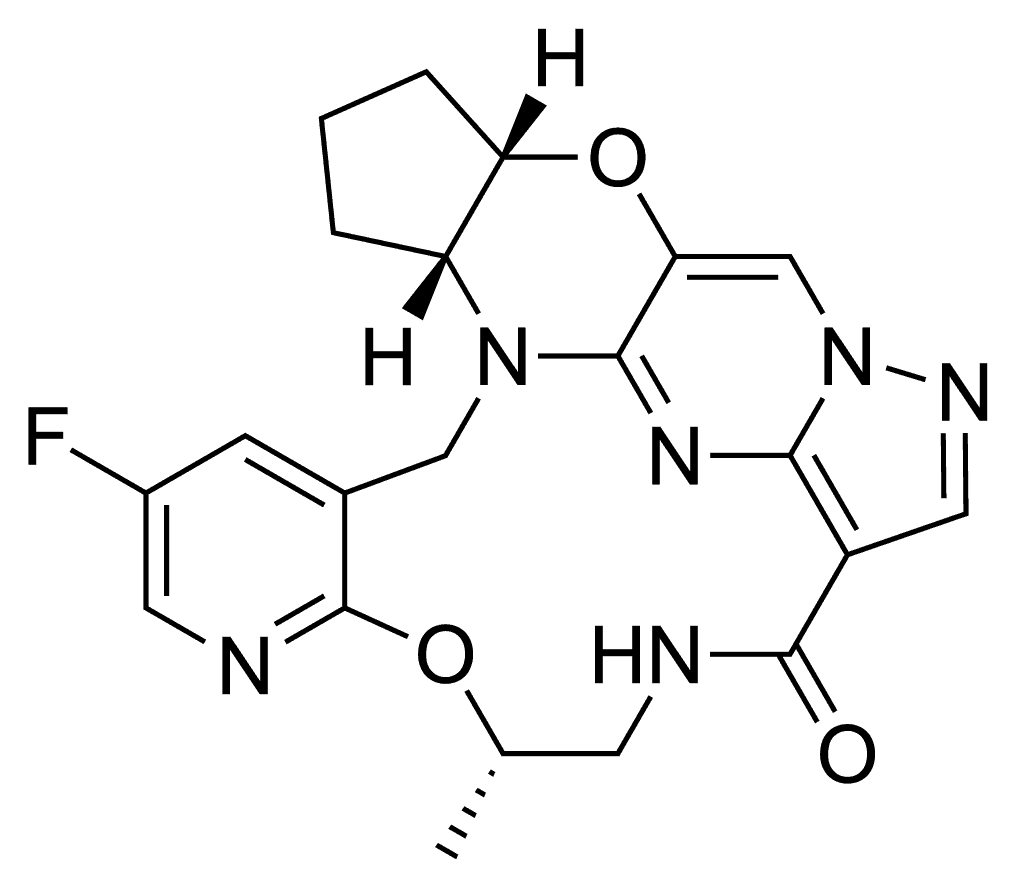

Identifiers
- IUPAC name: (1^{5a}R,1^{8a}S,5S)-3^{5}-fluoro-5-methyl-1^{5a},1^{7},1^{8},1^{8a}-tetrahydro-1^{6}H-4-oxa-7-aza-1(5,3)-cyclopenta[b]pyrazolo[1',5':1,2]pyrimido[4,5-e][1,4]oxazina-3(3,2)-pyridinacyclooctaphan-8-one
- CAS Number: 2359649-81-1 2359650-19-2
- PubChem CID: 146662764
- ChemSpider: 115010417
- UNII: 6EVK907XR
- KEGG: D12559
- ChEMBL: ChEMBL5095062

Chemical and physical data
- Formula: C_{21}H_{21}FN_{6}O_{3}
- Molar mass: 424.436 g·mol^{−1}
- 3D model (JSmol): Interactive image
- SMILES: C[C@H]1CNC(=O)C2=C3N=C4C(=CN3N=C2)O[C@H]5CCC[C@H]5N4CC6=C(O1)N=CC(=C6)F
- InChI: InChI=1S/C21H21FN6O3/c1-11-6-23-20(29)14-8-25-28-10-17-19(26-18(14)28)27(15-3-2-4-16(15)31-17)9-12-5-13(22)7-24-21(12)30-11/h5,7-8,10-11,15-16H,2-4,6,9H2,1H3,(H,23,29)/t11-,15+,16-/m0/s1; Key:BYYQDEOVMILBQT-XZJROXQQSA-N

Enbezotinib (TPX-0046) is an experimental anticancer medication which acts as a RET inhibitor, as well as an inhibitor of SRC kinase.

== See also ==
- Pralsetinib
- Rebecsinib
- Resigratinib
- Selpercatinib
- Zeteletinib
