= Resigratinib =

Chemical compound

Identifiers
- CAS Number: 2750709-91-0
- PubChem CID: 162381323
- UNII: W728TB393W

Chemical and physical data
- Formula: C_{26}H_{27}F_{2}N_{7}O_{3}
- Molar mass: 523.545 g·mol^{−1}
- 3D model (JSmol): Interactive image
- SMILES: CNC1=C(C(=NN1[C@H]2C[C@@H](N(C2)C(=O)C=C)COC)C#CC3=C(C=C4C(=C3F)N=CN4C5CC5)F)C(=O)N
- InChI: InChI=1S/C26H27F2N7O3/c1-4-21(36)33-11-15(9-16(33)12-38-3)35-26(30-2)22(25(29)37)19(32-35)8-7-17-18(27)10-20-24(23(17)28)31-13-34(20)14-5-6-14/h4,10,13-16,30H,1,5-6,9,11-12H2,2-3H3,(H2,29,37)/t15-,16+/m0/s1; Key:YXVDEILMUVTDMK-JKSUJKDBSA-N

Resigratinib (KIN-3248) is an experimental anticancer medication which acts as a fibroblast growth factor receptor inhibitor (FGFRi) and is in early stage human clinical trials.

== See also ==
- Enbezotinib
- Pralsetinib
- Rebecsinib
- Selpercatinib
- Zeteletinib
