= Rebecsinib =

Chemical compound

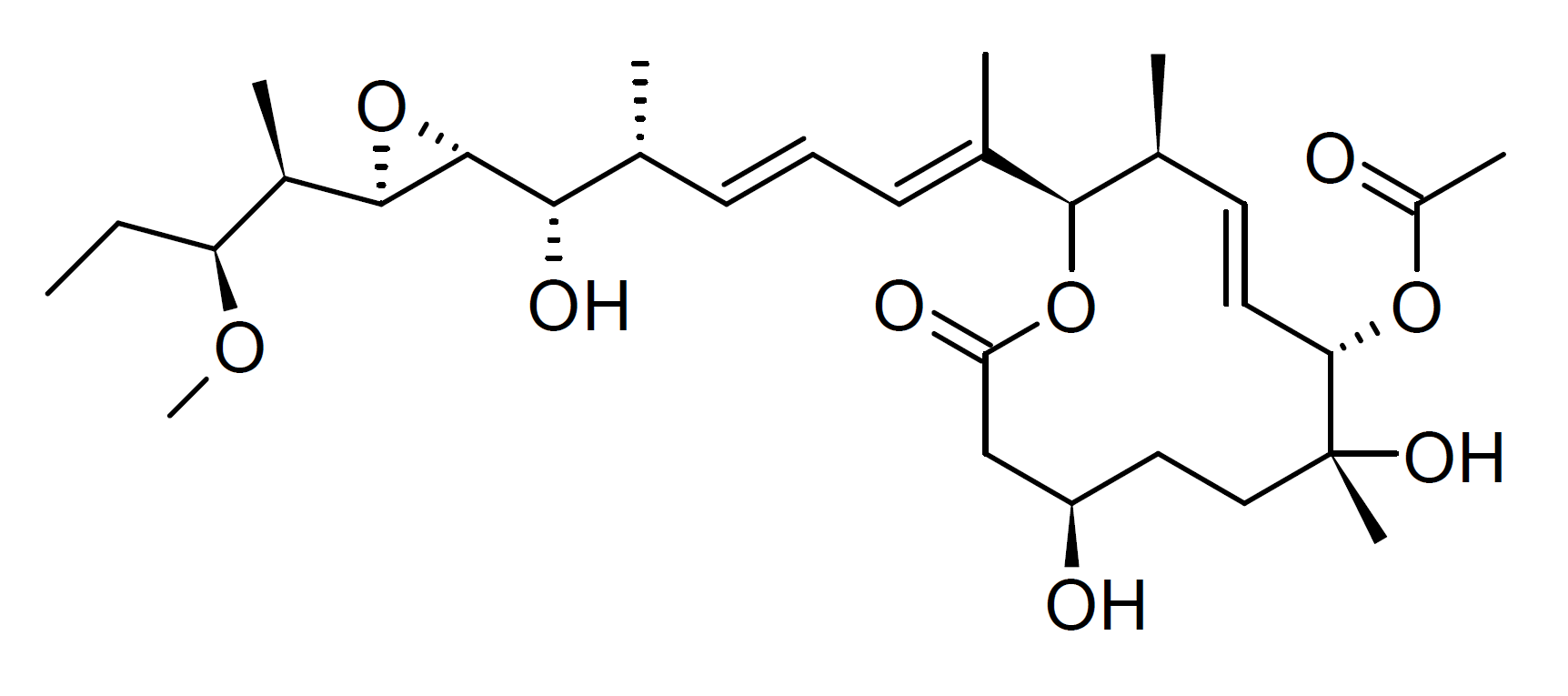

Identifiers
- IUPAC name: (2S,3S,6S,7R,10S,E)-7,10-dihydroxy-2-((2E,4E,6R,7S)-7-hydroxy-7-((2R,3R)-3-((2R,3S)-3-methoxypentan-2-yl)oxiran-2-yl)-6-methylhepta-2,4-dien-2-yl)-3,7-dimethyl-12-oxooxacyclododec-4-en-6-yl acetate
- CAS Number: 2598242-04-5
- PubChem CID: 9915974
- ChemSpider: 8091622
- ChEBI: CHEBI:226528

Chemical and physical data
- Formula: C_{31}H_{50}O_{9}
- Molar mass: 566.732 g·mol^{−1}
- 3D model (JSmol): Interactive image
- SMILES: CO[C@@H](CC)[C@@H](C)[C@H]1O[C@@H]1[C@@H](O)[C@H](C)\C=C\C=C(/C)[C@@H]1OC(=O)C[C@H](O)CC[C@@](C)(O)[C@@H](OC(C)=O)\C=C\[C@@H]1C
- InChI: InChI=1S/C31H50O9/c1-9-24(37-8)21(5)29-30(40-29)27(35)18(2)11-10-12-19(3)28-20(4)13-14-25(38-22(6)32)31(7,36)16-15-23(33)17-26(34)39-28/h10-14,18,20-21,23-25,27-30,33,35-36H,9,15-17H2,1-8H3/b11-10+,14-13+,19-12+; Key:LDCZLUDGHYDTHV-FPZDJJGISA-N

Rebecsinib (17S-FD-895) is an experimental anticancer medication derived by modification of the natural product Pladienolide B, which acts as an inhibitor of splicing-mediated activation of the enzyme ADAR1, and is in development as a potential treatment for leukemia.

== See also ==
- Enbezotinib
- Pralsetinib
- Resigratinib
- Selpercatinib
- Zeteletinib
