= RET inhibitor =

- Drug class
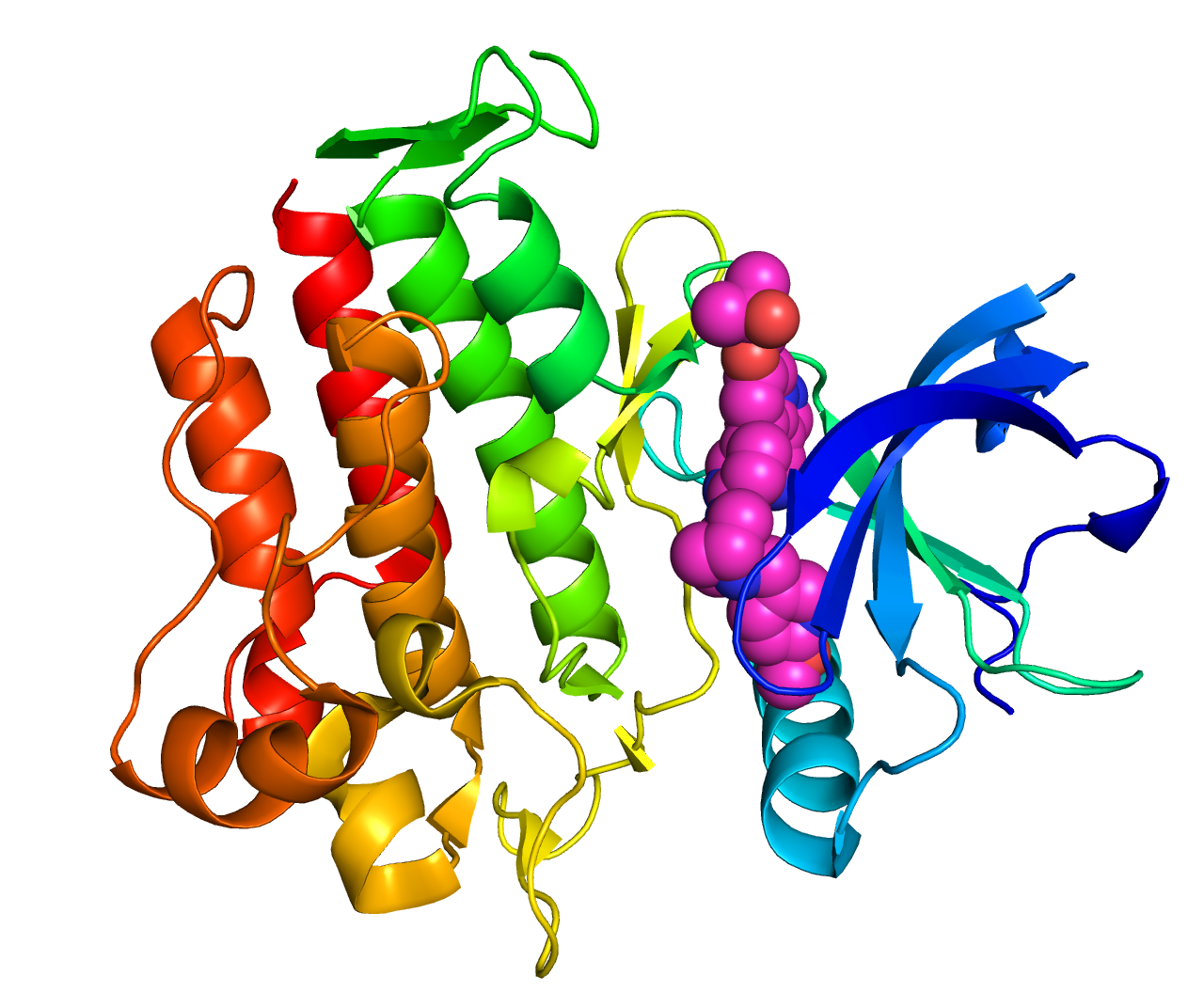
- Selpercatinib inhibitor (magenta spheres) complexed with RET kinase (rainbow colored)

Class identifiers
- ATC code: L01EX
- Biological target: RET proto-oncogene

Clinical data
- WebMD: RxList

External links
- MeSH: D051096

Legal status

RET kinase inhibitors are a type of targeted cancer treatment that block abnormally activated RET proto-oncogene, a protein involved in cell growth. These inhibitors are used to treat cancers like non-small cell lung cancer, medullary thyroid carcinoma, and some types of colorectal and pancreatic cancer.

RET inhibitors fall under the category of the tyrosine kinase inhibitors, which work by inhibiting proteins involved in the abnormal growth of cancer cells. Existing molecules fall in two main categories: the older multikinase inhibitors and the more recent selective inhibitors.

Although RET alterations are found at a low frequency across a broad range of tumors, the three main indications for RET inhibitors today are non-small cell lung cancer (NSCLC, which harbors RET fusions in 1-2% of cases), medullary thyroid cancer (MTC, with activating RET mutations in 25% of cases), and papillary thyroid cancer (PTC, where RET fusions are present in up to 80% of cases, depending on the region). As of 2020, up to 48 fusion partners have been cataloged in NSCLC rearrangements, with KIF5B and CCDC6 being the most prevalent. At least 10 different fusion variants have been described for KIF5B-RET, each with different breakpoints within the partner gene, but their clinical impact remains unclear as of 2018.

== Multikinase inhibitors ==
Cabozantinib, a multikinase inhibitor targeting c-MET, VEGFR2, AXL and RET

Multikinase inhibitors are molecules that possess a broad range of targets along with RET. These included cabozantinib, lenvatinib, sunitinib and alectinib. Since they were not designed to bind RET specifically, these inhibitors have other targets such as VEGFR, c-MET, and c-KIT. Among them, the VEGFR-related toxicities commonly precluded patients from achieving therapeutic doses with these medications, resulting in incomplete inhibition of RET and suboptimal clinical outcomes. In NSCLC, overall response rates (ORR) were low (16% for lenvatinib, 28% for cabozantinib), and progression-free survival (PFS) hovered around 6 months with a very high percentage of patients requiring dose reductions or discontinuing treatment (73% of patients on cabozantinib). Resistance to these medications included on-target mutations on the V804 gatekeeper residue, as well as off-target mechanisms such as EGFR pathway activation and MDM2 amplifications. Differences in efficacy also arose depending on the fusion partner, with non-KIF5B fusions typically responding better to these multikinase inhibitors than KIF5B-RET-driven tumors.

Compared to the much higher response rates and longer progression-free survivals achieved by selective inhibitors in other kinase fusions such as ALK or ROS1, these molecules offered much more limited clinical benefit, which highlighted a critical need for highly selective RET inhibitors.

== Selective RET inhibitors ==
Pralsetinib, a selective inhibitor of RET with activity against JAK2

Around 2017, the first selective RET inhibitors selpercatinib (LOXO-292) and pralsetinib (BLU-667) started their first phase I/II clinical trials in solid tumors. They were designed to have high potency for RET, along with low affinity for other related targets such as VEGFR-family kinases to limit off-target toxicities. They were also designed to overcome the V804 gatekeeper mutations that some patients acquired under multikinase inhibitors. In patients who had previously received platinum chemotherapies for their lung cancers, ORRs hovered around 60% with median PFS between 17 months and not-evaluable (NE). Similar promising results came out for thyroid cancers as well, with response rates at 70-80% and median PFS between 18 and 22 months. The encouraging results of the phase I/II trials led to the FDA approvals of selpercatinib (Retevmo™) for RET-driven NSCLC, MTC and PTC in May 2020, and the approval of pralsetinib (Gavreto™) for RET-fusion NSCLC in September 2020, as well as MTC and PTC in December 2020.

Resistance mechanisms to this first generation of selective RET inhibitors include different on-target mutations on the G810 solvent-front residue, as well as off-target alterations such as MET amplifications and KRAS mutations among others. TP53 mutational status appears to have an impact on prognosis and resistance mechanisms, with TP53-mutated tumors showing shorter PFS and mostly off-target resistance mechanisms.

== Investigational therapies ==
=== Single-compounds ===
Several other molecules are currently being investigated as selective RET inhibitors. Boston Therapeutics' BOS172738 seemingly falls in the same category as the approved first-generation inhibitors, with selectivity against VEGFR2, similar clinical activity, and susceptibility to the G810 resistance mutation. Turning Point Therapeutics' TPX-0046 is a compound that is claimed to target the G810 mutation, as well as Src family kinases, but is susceptible to the gatekeeper V804 mutation. Other compounds include Helsinn's HM06, which presented data in October 2021 showing significant activity against both the G810 and V804 mutations individually, making it a brain-penetrant second-generation RET inhibitor for which a clinical trial is open in the US since February 2021.

In 2021, Eli Lilly announced preclinical results for LOX-18228 and LOX-19260, two next-generation RET inhibitor candidates capable of tackling the G810 and V804 mutations individually as well as in tandem (G810+V804). The study looked at cell lines and mouse models with KIF5B-RET and CCDC6-RET fusions, as well as lines with the M918T mutation. The compounds showed strong selectivity and efficacy across cells lines. The company renamed one of these candidates LOXO-260, for which a Phase I clinical trial is expected in Q1 2022.

=== Combinations ===
While selective inhibitors are not yet (as of 2021) being evaluated in combination with other compounds to treat therapy-naïve patients, they are still being investigated to treat RET fusions arising as resistance mechanisms to other treatments. Notably, around 5% of EGFR-mutated non-small-cell lung cancers develop RET fusions as a resistance mechanism to the third-generation EGFR inhibitor osimertinib. For these patients, the combination of osimertinib and selpercatinib is currently being evaluated in a cohort of the ORCHARD study.

=== Discontinued compounds ===
Among older compounds being investigated for RET inhibition, RXDX-105 was being developed by Ignyta as a VEGF-sparing multikinase inhibitor of BRAF, RET and EGFR. It was discontinued after acquisition of the company by Hoffmann-La Roche, citing a poor efficacy profile compared to the selective inhibitors being developed parallel to it. While it boasted a 75% response rate among fusions with non-KIF5B partners (6 out of 8 patients), there were no responses for patients with the KIF5B fusion partner (0 out of 20 patients), which represents more than 65% of RET fusions in NSCLC. Among cited reasons for this difference is the KIF5B promoter inducing higher expression of the KIF5B-RET fusion protein compared to other partners, which would result in incomplete inhibition at clinical doses of RXDX-105 and reduced therapeutic activity.

== Diagnostics ==
In order to identify patients most likely to benefit from RET inhibitors, several companion diagnostic assays are approved. Regardless of the alteration, tissue-based NGS remains the gold standard with very high specificity and sensitivity. In the case of rearrangements, RT-PCR is a proven technique with high specificity and sensitivity, but it will miss fusions with rare partners. FISH can be used where other techniques are not available, but the relative subjectivity of the test along with the proximity of common partners to the RET gene can make it difficult to discern rearrangements. Plasma-based NGS assays are becoming more and more prevalent because of their ease of use and high specificity, although they are limited by how much circulating tumor DNA is present in the sample, which itself depends upon how much DNA the tumors shed into the blood. This means that while a positive result may be taken as certainty, a negative result might simply mean not enough material was collected, and should be confirmed with another technique to rule out a false-negative.
