= HS-10365 =

HS-10365 is a RET tyrosine kinase inhibitor developed for non-small cell lung cancer by Hansen Pharmaceutical.
