= GFRAL =

Protein-coding gene in the species Homo sapiens

Identifiers
- Aliases: GFRAL, C6orf144, GRAL, UNQ9356, bA360D14.1, GDNF family receptor alpha like
- External IDs: OMIM: 617837; MGI: 3607786; GeneCards: GFRAL

Gene location (Human)
Chr.	Chromosome 6 (human)
Band	6p12.1	Start	55,327,469 bp
Band	6p12.1	End	55,402,493 bp

Gene location (Mouse)
Chr.	Chromosome 9 (mouse)
Band	9|9 D	Start	76,071,384 bp
Band	9|9 D	End	76,120,939 bp
RNA expression pattern
Bgee	Human / Mouse (ortholog); Top expressed in: testicle; sural nerve; right lobe of liver; subcutaneous adipose tissue; body of pancreas; lactiferous gland / Top expressed in: embryo; More reference expression data
BioGPS	n/a
Gene ontology
Molecular function	signaling receptor activity; protein binding; glial cell-derived neurotrophic factor receptor activity; receptor tyrosine kinase binding
Cellular component	integral component of membrane; plasma membrane; intracellular anatomical structure; membrane; external side of plasma membrane; receptor complex
Biological process	negative regulation of neuron apoptotic process; stress-activated protein kinase signaling cascade; negative regulation of extrinsic apoptotic signaling pathway in absence of ligand; reduction of food intake in response to dietary excess; glial cell-derived neurotrophic factor receptor signaling pathway; positive regulation of MAPK cascade; positive regulation of protein kinase B signaling; nervous system development
Sources:Amigo / QuickGO
Orthologs
Databases	NCBI: entry; OMA: entry
Species	Human	Mouse
Entrez	389400	404194
Ensembl	ENSG00000187871	ENSMUSG00000059383
UniProt	Q6UXV0	Q6SJE0
RefSeq (mRNA)	NM_207410	NM_205844
RefSeq (protein)	NP_997293	NP_995316
Location (UCSC)	Chr 6: 55.33 – 55.4 Mb	Chr 9: 76.07 – 76.12 Mb
PubMed search
- Wikidata
View/Edit Human	View/Edit Mouse

GDNF family receptor alpha like is a protein that in humans is encoded by the GFRAL gene.

== See also ==
- GDNF family of ligands
  - Glial cell line-derived neurotrophic factor (GDNF)
- GDNF family receptor-α (GFRα)
