= Ana Gjorgjioska =

Macedonian scientist and researcher

Ana Gjorgjioska Kamova (born 7 April 2000) is a Macedonian scientist and researcher. She works in the field of immunotherapy in the treatment of cancer at CatalYm GmbH. Within the scope of her projects, she focuses on the molecule GDF15.

== Life and career ==
=== Early life ===
Ana Gjorgjioska was born in Gostivar, North Macedonia to mother Žaklina Gjorgjioska, a Macedonian language teacher and father Gjorgjioski, a businessman. She has a younger brother, Ognjen Gjorgjioski. She spent her teenage years in the town of Gostivar and finished high school at Gymnasium "Panče Poposki".

In primary school, Gjorgjioska won first prize in the national chemistry competition, which sparked her interest in a career in science.

In 2017, Gjorgjioska started her studies at Constructor University (then Jacobs University Bremen) in the field of biochemistry and cell biology. She then pursued her master's degree at Eberhard Karls University of Tübingen, in the direction of molecular biology and immunology.

== Private life ==
Gjorgioska speaks Macedonian, English, Serbian and German. She currently lives and works in München, Germany.
