= Neurotrophic factors =

Family of biomolecules

Neurotrophic factors (NTFs) are a family of small soluble proteins and peptides that support neuronal growth and survival as well as differentiation in developing neurons. In the mature nervous system, they maintain existing neurons, induce synaptic plasticity, and modulate the formation of long-term memories. Neurotrophic factors also promote the initial growth and development of neurons in the central and peripheral nervous systems, and are capable of repairing damaged neurons outside of living organisms and in animal models. NTFs utilize a high affinity for transmembrane receptor tyrosine kinases (Trks), and p75 neurotrophic receptors to activate signaling pathways. Neurotrophic factors may be released by target tissues to guide the growth of developing axons. Most neurotrophic factors belong to one of three families: (1) neurotrophins, (2) glial cell-line derived neurotrophic factor family ligands (GFLs), and (3) neuropoietic cytokines. Each family has its own distinct cell signaling mechanisms, although elicited cellular responses ofter overlap.

Currently, neurotrophic factors are being intensely studied for use in bioartificial nerve conduits because they are necessary in vivo for directing axon growth and regeneration. In studies, neurotrophic factors are normally used in conjunction with other techniques such as biological and physical cues created by the addition of cells and specific topographies. The neurotrophic factors may or may not be immobilized to the scaffold structure, though immobilization is preferred because it allows for the creation of permanent, controllable gradients. In some cases, such as neural drug delivery systems, they are loosely immobilized such that they can be selectively released at specified times and in specified amounts.

== List of neurotrophic factors ==
Although more information is being discovered about neurotrophic factors, their classification is based on different cellular mechanisms and they are grouped into three main families: the neurotrophins, the CNTF family, and GDNF family.

=== Neurotrophins ===
==== Brain-derived neurotrophic factor ====
Brain-derived neurotrophic factor (BDNF) is structurally similar to NGF, NT-3, and NT-4/5, and shares the TrkB receptor with NT-4. The brain-derived neurotrophic factor/TrkB system promotes thymocyte survival, as studied in the thymus of mice. Other experiments suggest BDNF is more important and necessary for neuronal survival than other factors. However, this compensatory mechanism is still not known. Specifically, BDNF promotes survival of dorsal root ganglion neurons. Even when bound to a truncated TrkB, BDNF still shows growth and developmental roles. Without BDNF (homozygous (-/-)), mice do not survive past three weeks.

Including development, BDNF has important regulatory roles in the development of the visual cortex, enhancing neurogenesis, and improving learning and memory. Specifically, BDNF acts within the hippocampus. Studies have shown that corticosterone treatment and adrenalectomy reduces or upregulated hippocampal BDNF expression. Consistent between human and animal studies, BDNF levels are decreased in those with untreated major depression. However, the correlation between BDNF levels and depression is controversial.

==== Nerve growth factor ====
Nerve growth factor (NGF) uses the high-affinity receptor TrkA to promote myelination and the differentiation of neurons. Studies have shown dysregulation of NGF causes hyperalgesia and pain. NGF production is highly correlated to the extent of inflammation. Even though it is clear that exogenous administration of NGF helps decrease tissue inflammation, the molecular mechanisms are still unknown. Moreover, blood NGF levels are increased in times of stress, during immune disease, and with asthma or arthritis, amongst other conditions.

==== Neurotrophin-3 ====
Whereas neurotrophic factors within the neurotrophin family commonly have a protein tyrosine kinase receptor (Trk), Neurotrophin-3 (NT-3) has the unique receptor, TrkC. In fact, the discovery of the different receptors helped differentiate scientists' understanding and classification of NT-3. NT-3 does share similar properties with other members of this class, and is known to be important in neuronal survival. The NT-3 protein is found within the thymus, spleen, intestinal epithelium but its role in the function of each organ is still unknown.

=== CNTF family ===
The CNTF family of neurotrophic factors includes ciliary neurotrophic factor (CNTF), leukemia inhibitory factor (LIF), interleukin-6 (IL-6), prolactin, growth hormone, leptin, interferons (i.e., interferon-α, -β, and -γ), and oncostatin M.

==== Ciliary neurotrophic factor ====
Ciliary neurotrophic factor affects embryonic motor neurons, dorsal root ganglion sensory neurons, and ciliary neuron hippocampal neurons. It is structurally related to leukemia inhibitory factor (LIF), interleukin 6 (IL-6), and oncostatin M (OSM). CNTF prevents degeneration of motor neurons in rats and mice which increases survival time and motor function of the mice. These results suggest exogenous CNTF could be used as a therapeutic treatment for human degenerative motor neuron diseases. It also has unexpected leptin-like characteristics as it causes weight loss.

=== GDNF family ===
The GDNF family of ligands includes glial cell line-derived neurotrophic factor (GDNF), artemin, neurturin, and persephin.

==== Glial cell line-derived neurotrophic factor ====
Glial cell line-derived neurotrophic factor (GDNF) was originally detected as survival promoter derived from a glioma cell. Later studies determined GDNF uses a receptor tyrosine kinase and a high-affinity ligand-binding co-receptor GFRα. GDNF has an especially strong affinity for dopaminergic (DA) neurons. Specifically, studies have shown GDNF plays a protective role against MPTP toxins for DA neurons. It has also been detected in motor neurons of embryonic rats and is suggested to aid development and to reduce axotomy.

=== EGF and TGF families ===
The EGF and TGF families of neurotrophic factors are composed of epidermal growth factor, the neuregulins, transforming growth factor alpha (TGFα), and transforming growth factor beta (TGFβ). They signal through receptor tyrosine kinases and serine/threonine protein kinases.

=== Other neurotrophic factors ===
Several other biomolecules that have identified as neurotrophic factors include: glia maturation factor, insulin, insulin-like growth factor 1 (IGF-1), vascular endothelial growth factor (VEGF), fibroblast growth factor (FGF), platelet-derived growth factor (PDGF), pituitary adenylate cyclase-activating peptide (PACAP), interleukin-1 (IL-1), interleukin-2 (IL-2), interleukin-3 (IL-3), interleukin-5 (IL-5), interleukin-8 (IL-8), macrophage colony-stimulating factor (M-CSF), granulocyte-macrophage colony-stimulating factor (GM-CSF), and neurotactin.
