= DOK5 =

Protein-coding gene in the species Homo sapiens

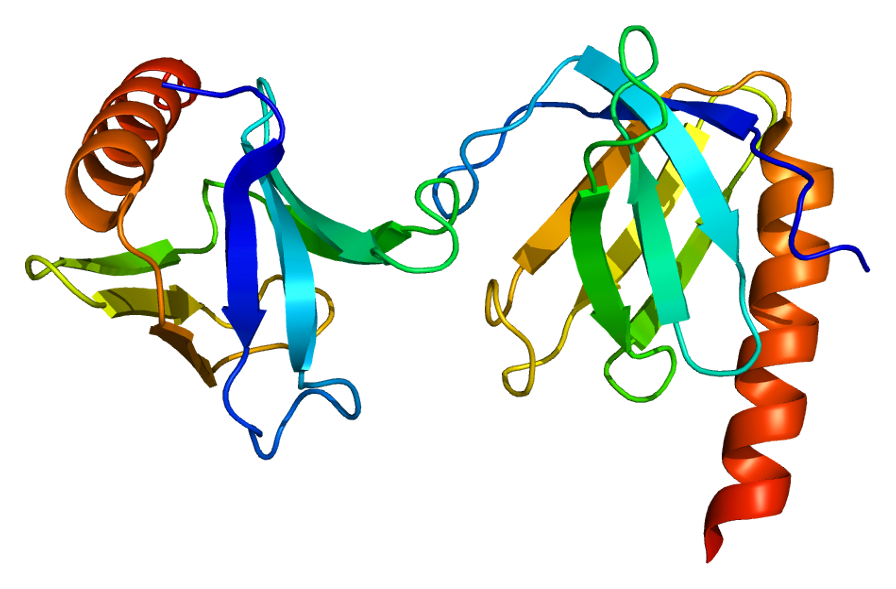

Identifiers
- Aliases: DOK5, C20orf180, IRS-6, IRS6, docking protein 5
- External IDs: OMIM: 608334; MGI: 1924079; GeneCards: DOK5
Available structures
PDB	Ortholog search: PDBe RCSB
PDB	List of PDB id codes 1J0W

Gene location (Human)
Chr.	Chromosome 20 (human)
Band	20q13.2	Start	54,475,593 bp
Band	20q13.2	End	54,651,169 bp

Gene location (Mouse)
Chr.	Chromosome 2 (mouse)
Band	2 H3|2 92.26 cM	Start	170,573,727 bp
Band	2 H3|2 92.26 cM	End	170,721,689 bp
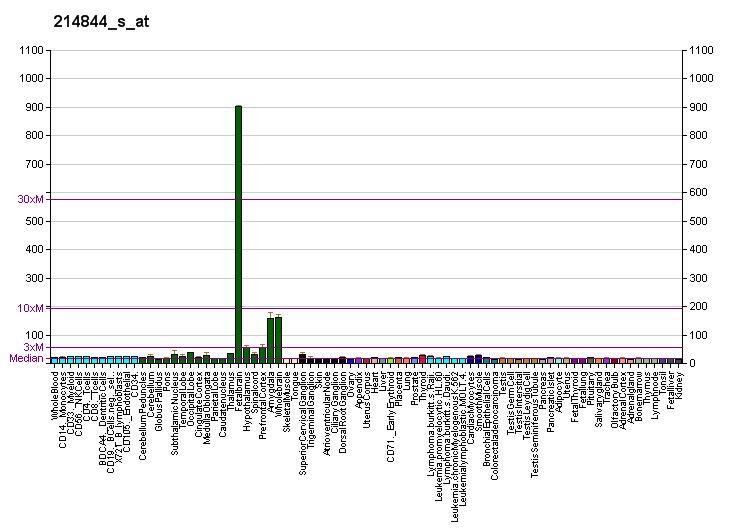
RNA expression pattern
Bgee	Human / Mouse (ortholog); Top expressed in: ventricular zone; ganglionic eminence; pancreatic ductal cell; vastus lateralis muscle; cartilage tissue; Skeletal muscle tissue of rectus abdominis; biceps brachii; Skeletal muscle tissue of biceps brachii; deltoid muscle; Brodmann area 46 / Top expressed in: ventricular zone; visual cortex; primary visual cortex; soleus muscle; superior frontal gyrus; genital tubercle; dentate gyrus of hippocampal formation granule cell; neural tube; neural layer of retina; embryo; More reference expression data
BioGPS	More reference expression data
Orthologs
Databases	NCBI: entry; OMA: entry
Species	Human	Mouse
Entrez	55816	76829
Ensembl	ENSG00000101134	ENSMUSG00000027560
UniProt	Q9P104	Q91ZM9
RefSeq (mRNA)	NM_001294161; NM_018431; NM_177959	NM_001163686; NM_029761
RefSeq (protein)	NP_001281090; NP_060901; NP_808874	NP_001157158; NP_084037
Location (UCSC)	Chr 20: 54.48 – 54.65 Mb	Chr 2: 170.57 – 170.72 Mb
PubMed search
- Wikidata
View/Edit Human	View/Edit Mouse

Docking protein 5 is a protein that in humans is encoded by the DOK5 gene.

== Function ==
The protein encoded by this gene is a member of the DOK family of membrane proteins, which are adapter proteins involved in signal transduction. The encoded protein interacts with phosphorylated receptor tyrosine kinases to mediate neurite outgrowth and activation of the MAP kinase pathway. In contrast to other DOK family proteins, this protein does not interact with RASGAP.

== Interactions ==
DOK5 has been shown to interact with RET proto-oncogene.
