= Ponsegromab =

Monoclonal antibody

Monoclonal antibody
- Type: ?
- Target: GDF-15

Clinical data
- Other names: PF-06946860

Legal status
- Legal status: Investigational

Identifiers
- CAS Number: 2368950-15-4
- UNII: GXA6PF0254

Ponsegromab (PF-06946860) is a monoclonal antibody that works as a GDF-15 inhibitor. It is developed by Pfizer for cancer cachexia.

In September 2024, Pfizer disclosed that ponsegromab led to significant body weight increases in patients with non-small cell lung cancer, pancreatic cancer, or colorectal cancer in a phase 2 clinical trial.
