= GFRA2 =

Protein-coding gene in the species Homo sapiens

Identifiers
- Aliases: GFRA2, GDNFRB, NRTNR-ALPHA, NTNRA, RETL2, TRNR2, GDNF family receptor alpha 2
- External IDs: OMIM: 601956; MGI: 1195462; GeneCards: GFRA2

Gene location (Human)
Chr.	Chromosome 8 (human)
Band	8p21.3	Start	21,690,398 bp
Band	8p21.3	End	21,812,357 bp

Gene location (Mouse)
Chr.	Chromosome 14 (mouse)
Band	14|14 D2	Start	71,127,560 bp
Band	14|14 D2	End	71,217,278 bp
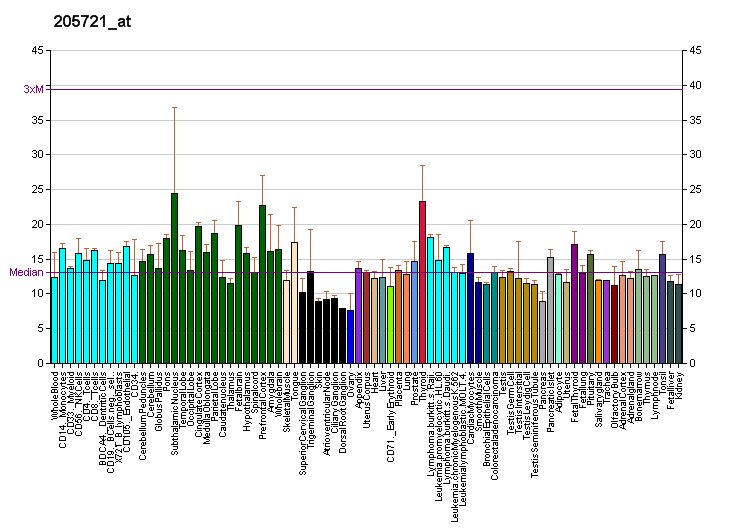

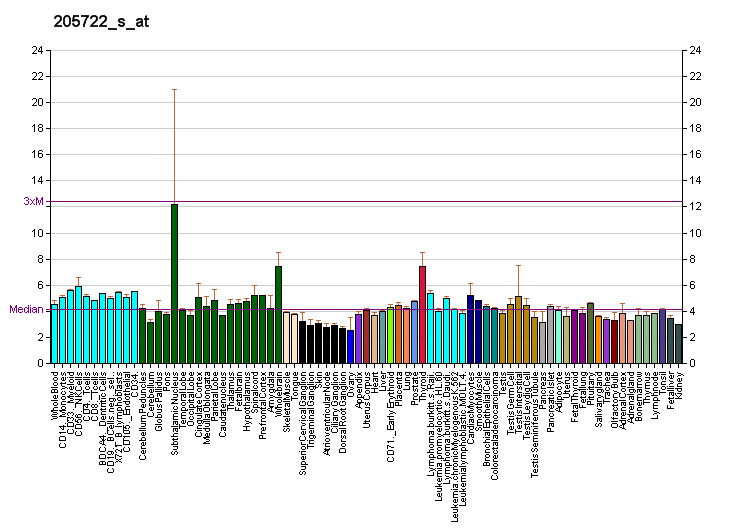
RNA expression pattern
Bgee	Human / Mouse (ortholog); Top expressed in: secondary oocyte; Brodmann area 10; left lobe of thyroid gland; right lobe of thyroid gland; right frontal lobe; Brodmann area 9; primary visual cortex; cingulate gyrus; anterior cingulate cortex; testicle / Top expressed in: left lung lobe; median eminence; lumbar spinal ganglion; ascending aorta; aortic valve; lateral septal nucleus; genital tubercle; Gonadal ridge; molar; arcuate nucleus; More reference expression data
BioGPS	More reference expression data
Gene ontology
Molecular function	glial cell-derived neurotrophic factor receptor activity; signaling receptor activity
Cellular component	anchored component of membrane; membrane; extrinsic component of membrane; plasma membrane; intracellular anatomical structure; external side of plasma membrane; receptor complex
Biological process	glial cell-derived neurotrophic factor receptor signaling pathway; nervous system development; transmembrane receptor protein tyrosine kinase signaling pathway; MAPK cascade; axon guidance; positive regulation of peptidyl-serine phosphorylation of STAT protein; negative regulation of protein autophosphorylation
Sources:Amigo / QuickGO
Orthologs
Databases	NCBI: entry; OMA: entry
Species	Human	Mouse
Entrez	2675	14586
Ensembl	ENSG00000168546	ENSMUSG00000022103
UniProt	O00451	O08842
RefSeq (mRNA)	NM_001165038; NM_001165039; NM_001495	NM_008115; NM_001302094; NM_001302095
RefSeq (protein)	NP_001158510; NP_001158511; NP_001486	NP_001289023; NP_001289024; NP_032141
Location (UCSC)	Chr 8: 21.69 – 21.81 Mb	Chr 14: 71.13 – 71.22 Mb
PubMed search
- Wikidata
View/Edit Human	View/Edit Mouse

GDNF family receptor alpha-2 (GFRα2), also known as the neurturin receptor, is a protein that in humans is encoded by the GFRA2 gene.

== Function ==
The GFRA2 protein is a glycosylphosphatidylinositol(GPI)-linked cell surface receptor. It is part of the GDNF receptor family. Glial cell line-derived neurotrophic factor (GDNF) and neurturin (NTN) are two structurally related, potent neurotrophic factors that play key roles in the control of neuron survival and differentiation. They both bind the GFRA2 receptor. The receptor mediates activation of the RET tyrosine kinase receptor. This encoded protein acts preferentially as a receptor for NTN compared to its other family member, GDNF family receptor alpha 1. This gene is a candidate gene for RET-associated diseases.

== Interactions ==
GFRA2 (gene) has been shown to interact with GDNF.

== See also ==
- GFRα
