= Ramogen =

The term ramogen refers to a biological factor, typically a growth factor or other protein, that causes a developing biological cell or tissue to branch in a tree-like manner. Ramogenic molecules are branch promoting molecules found throughout the human body.

Brief History

The term was first coined (from the Latin ramus = branch and the Greek genesis = creation) in an article about kidney development by Davies and Davey (Pediatr Nephrol. 1999 Aug;13(6):535-41). In the article, Davies and Davy describe the existence of "ramogens" in the kidney as glial cell line-derived neurotrophic factors, neurturin and persephin. The term has now passed into general use in the technical literature concerned with branching of biological structures.

Function A ramogen is a biochemical signal that enables the creation of a physiological branch. The signal can be in the form of a growth factor or a hormone that makes a tube branch. One specific example would be the hormone that forms the simple tube through which the mammary glands begin to form causing the formation of a highly branched “tree” of milk ducts in females.

Types of Ramogens

Mesenchyme-derived ramogens are found throughout the body and serve as chemoattractants to branching tissues. An example of how this works is found through a study on a bead soaked in the renal ramogen GDNF. When this ramogen was placed next to a kidney sample in culture, the nearby uteric parts branch and grow toward it.

Another example of a ramogen in use was found in the lungs. The existence of Sprouty2 in the body is demonstrated in response to the signaling of the ramogen FGF10, serving as an inhibitor of branching.

The following table is a list of Key Ramogens in Branching Organs of a mouse species.

Branching System	Main Paracrine Ramogen
Trachae in D. melanogaster	Branchless (FGF homologue) via breathless (FGFR homologue
Lung	FGF10 via FGFRIIIb
Pancreas	FGF10 via FGFRIIIb
Mammary Gland	FGF7 via FGFRIIIb
Kidney	GDNF via FGRa1-Ret-complex
Prostate	FGF7 via FGFRIIIb

Studies involving Ramogens

The physiological capabilities of ramogens are still being postulated in medical studies involving kidney functions on mice.

In development maturing nephrons and stroma in the body may cease to produce ramogens and may begin to secrete anti-ramogenic factors, such as Bmp2 and Tgfβ.

The pattern of branching and the rate of cell proliferation can contribute to the shape of different organs. As such, the use of the glial-cell-line neurotrophic factor (GDNF) has been found to contribute to uterine tissues.

The implication of this is that the introduction of ramogens to the body can cause cell repair through the creation of side branches introduced through ramogenic signals in the body ).

This is evidenced through studies demonstrating that uterine stalks were capable of forming new tips if provided with fresh mesenchyme or with a Matrigel artificially loaded with ramogens, such as GDNF and FGF1. The ramogens used in this study were manufactured with fresh mesenchyme.
