= GDF15 =

Protein-coding gene in humans

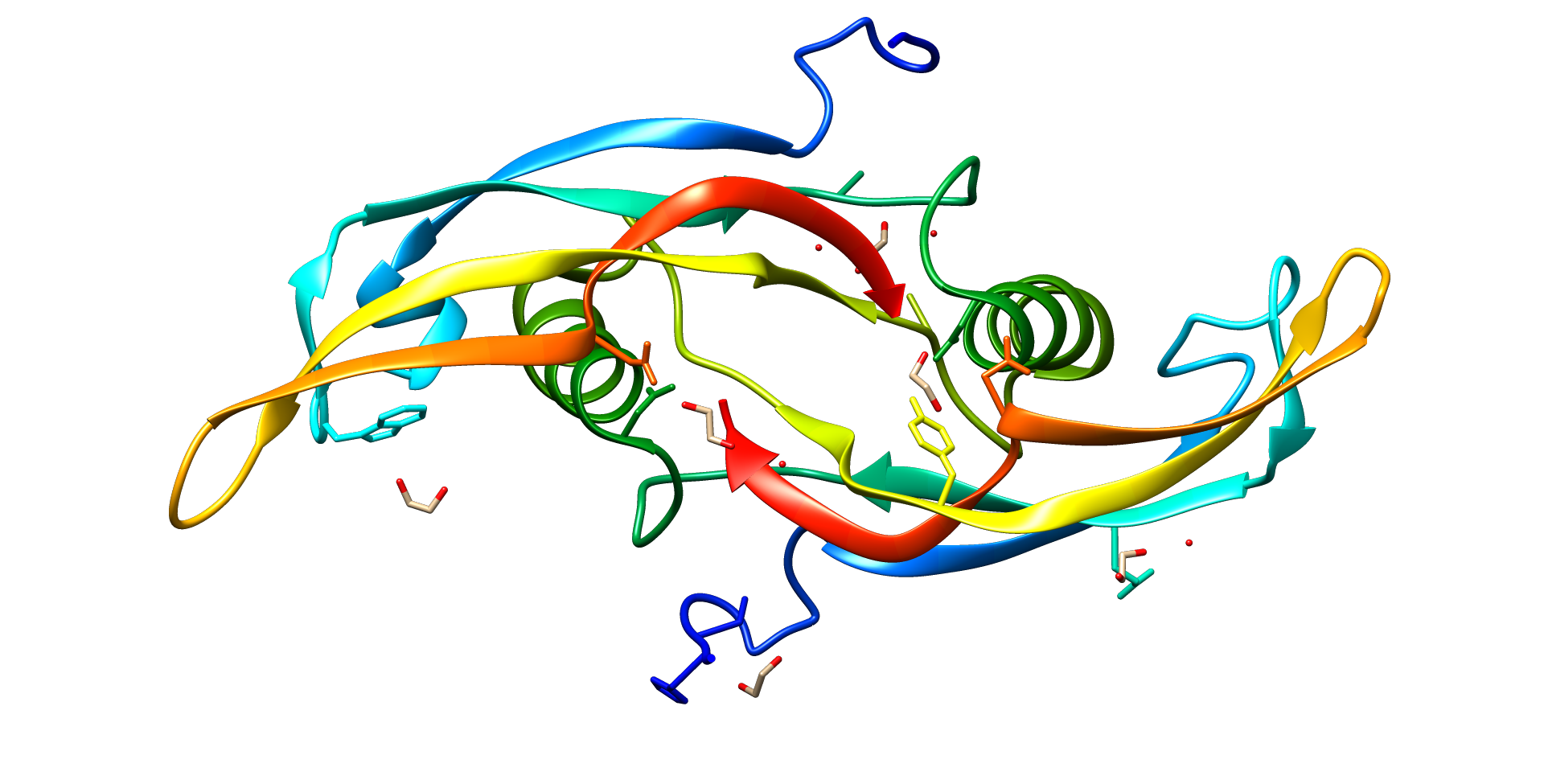

Identifiers
- Aliases: GDF15, GDF-15, MIC-1, MIC1, NAG-1, PDF, PLAB, PTGFB, growth differentiation factor 15, TGF-PL
- External IDs: OMIM: 605312; MGI: 1346047; GeneCards: GDF15
Available structures
PDB	Ortholog search: PDBe RCSB
PDB	List of PDB id codes 5VT2, 5VZ3, 5VZ4, 6Q2J

Gene location (Human)
Chr.	Chromosome 19 (human)
Band	19p13.11	Start	18,374,731 bp
Band	19p13.11	End	18,389,176 bp

Gene location (Mouse)
Chr.	Chromosome 8 (mouse)
Band	8|8 B3.3	Start	71,082,043 bp
Band	8|8 B3.3	End	71,085,106 bp
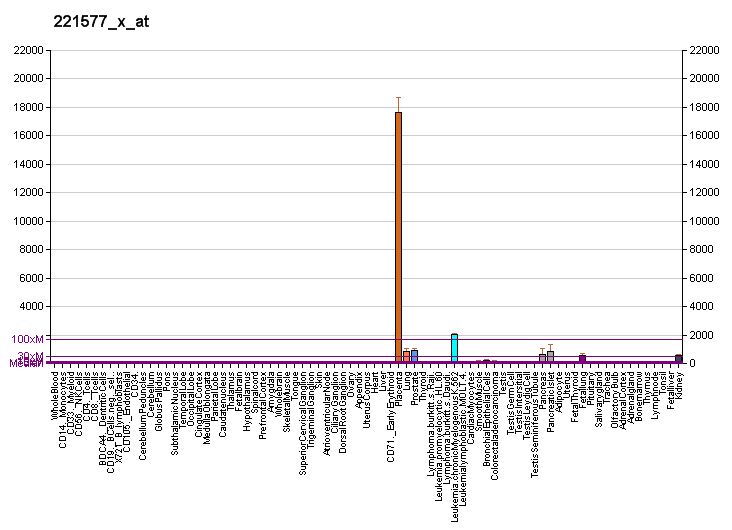
RNA expression pattern
Bgee	Human / Mouse (ortholog); Top expressed in: placenta; beta cell; mucosa of urinary bladder; human kidney; body of pancreas; renal medulla; olfactory zone of nasal mucosa; decidua; stromal cell of endometrium; rectum / Top expressed in: stroma of bone marrow; endothelial cell of lymphatic vessel; calvaria; left lobe of liver; right kidney; embryo; proximal tubule; embryo; human kidney; lacrimal gland; More reference expression data
BioGPS	More reference expression data
Gene ontology
Molecular function	transforming growth factor beta receptor binding; growth factor activity; protein binding; cytokine activity; protein homodimerization activity
Cellular component	extracellular region; extracellular exosome; nucleus; cytoplasm; extracellular space; Golgi apparatus; collagen-containing extracellular matrix
Biological process	regulation of apoptotic process; cell-cell signaling; positive regulation of pathway-restricted SMAD protein phosphorylation; positive regulation of myoblast fusion; regulation of MAPK cascade; transforming growth factor beta receptor signaling pathway; cell development; signal transduction; BMP signaling pathway; SMAD protein signal transduction; regulation of signaling receptor activity; reduction of food intake in response to dietary excess; glial cell-derived neurotrophic factor receptor signaling pathway; negative regulation of multicellular organism growth; positive regulation of MAPK cascade; positive regulation of protein kinase B signaling; negative regulation of growth hormone receptor signaling pathway
Sources:Amigo / QuickGO
Orthologs
Databases	NCBI: entry; OMA: entry
Species	Human	Mouse
Entrez	9518	23886
Ensembl	ENSG00000130513	ENSMUSG00000038508
UniProt	Q99988	Q9Z0J7
RefSeq (mRNA)	NM_004864	NM_011819; NM_001330687
RefSeq (protein)	NP_004855	NP_001317616; NP_035949
Location (UCSC)	Chr 19: 18.37 – 18.39 Mb	Chr 8: 71.08 – 71.09 Mb
PubMed search
- Wikidata
View/Edit Human	View/Edit Mouse

Growth/differentiation factor 15 is a protein that in humans is encoded by the GDF15 gene. GDF15 was first identified as Macrophage inhibitory cytokine-1 (MIC-1).

It is a protein belonging to the transforming growth factor beta superfamily. Under normal conditions, GDF15 is expressed in low concentrations in most organs and is upregulated because of injury to organs such as the liver, kidney, heart and lung. Its chemical formula is:C_{1076}H_{1710}O_{316}N_{324}S_{24}.

In one study among Scottish males, median (97.5th percentile), GDF-15 concentration at age <30 years was 537 (1,135) pg/mL, rising to 931 (2,492) pg/mL at 50–59 years, and 2,152 (5,972) pg/mL at ≥80 years. In Scottish females, median GDF-15 at age <30 years was 628 (2,195) pg/mL, 881 (2,323) pg/mL at 50–59 years, and 1847 (6,830) pg/mL at ≥80 years. Among those known to be pregnant, median GDF-15 was 19,311 pg/mL.

== Function ==
The precise biological role of GDF15 remains to be fully elucidated, but it is recognized as a key modulator of inflammatory pathways. Furthermore, it regulates fundamental cellular processes including apoptosis, angiogenesis, cell repair, and growth, which are crucial in the pathophysiology of cardiovascular and neoplastic diseases.

== Clinical significance ==
GDF15 has shown to be a strong prognostic protein in patients with different diseases such as heart diseases and cancer. In cardiovascular tissues it is shown that GDF15 concentrations increase in response to atherosclerosis, ischemia/reperfusion injury and heart failure. In patients with coronary artery disease (CAD), GDF15 is shown to be associated with adverse outcome such as mortality, myocardial infarction, stroke and with bleeding.

However, elevated GDF15 levels in diseases such as cancer and heart disease may be the result of inflammation caused by these diseases. Note that GDF15 is necessary for surviving both bacterial and viral infections, as well as sepsis. The protective effects of GDF15 were largely independent of pathogen control or the magnitude of inflammatory response, suggesting a role in disease tolerance.

Metformin was shown to cause increased levels of GDF15. This increase mediates the effect of body weight loss by metformin. Further study has shown weight loss is promoted by maintaining energy expenditure in addition to appetite suppression.

Elevations in GDF15 reduce food intake and body mass in animal models through binding to glial cell-derived neurotrophic factor family receptor alpha-like (GFRAL) and the recruitment of the receptor tyrosine kinase RET in the hindbrain.

In both mice and humans have shown that metformin and exercise increase circulating levels of GDF15. GDF15 might also exert anti-inflammatory effects through mechanisms that are not fully understood. These unique and distinct mechanisms for suppressing food intake and inflammation makes GDF15 an appealing candidate to treat many metabolic diseases, including obesity, type 2 diabetes mellitus, non-alcoholic fatty liver disease, cardiovascular disease and cancer cachexia.

Treatment of rodents fed a high-fat diet with recombinant growth differentiating factor 15 (GDF15) reduces obesity and improves glycemic control through glial-cell-derived neurotrophic factor family receptor α-like (GFRAL)-dependent suppression of food intake.

Fibroblast-specific loss of GDF15 expression in a model of 3D reconstructed human skin induced epidermal thinning, a hallmark of skin aging. GDF15 plays a so far undisclosed role in mitochondrial homeostasis to delay both the onset of cellular senescence and the appearance of age-related changes in a 3D human skin model.

It has been also associated as a causal factor in hyperemesis gravidarum, severe morning sickness.

=== Therapeutics development ===
GDF15 is being evaluated as a therapeutic target for treatment of cancer cachexia. In September 2024, Pfizer disclosed that the anti-GDF15 monoclonal antibody ponsegromab led to significant increases in body weight in patients with non-small cell lung cancer, pancreatic cancer, and colorectal cancer.

GDF15 could be evaluated as a therapeutic target for treatment of hyperemesis gravidarum, severe morning sickness, by building up a tolerance before pregnancy to the excessively > 10,000 pg/mL increasing levels that the fetus produces as it develops.
