= GFRA1 =

Protein-coding gene in the species Homo sapiens

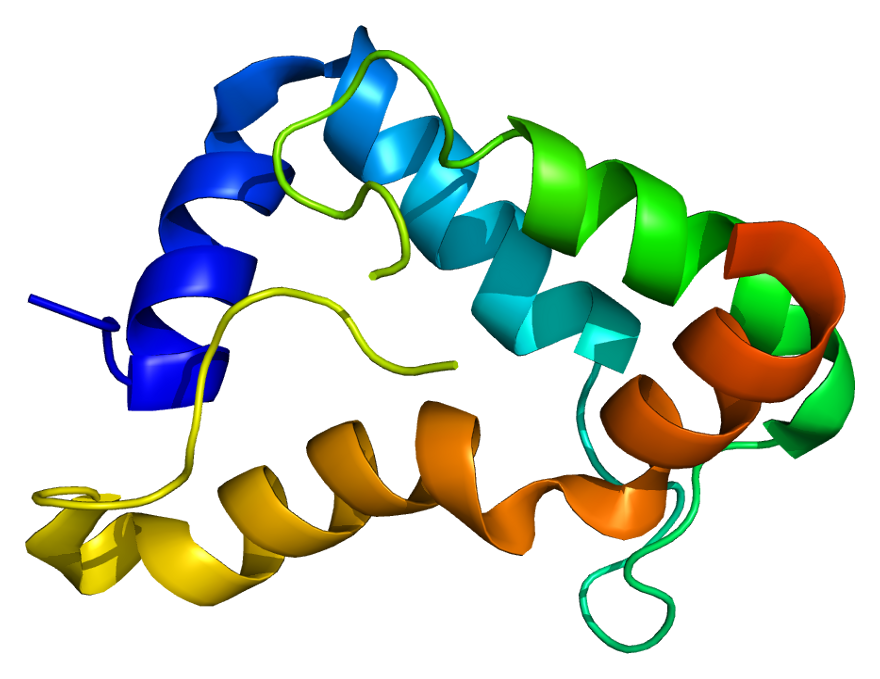

Identifiers
- Aliases: GFRA1, GDNFR, GDNFRA, GFR-ALPHA-1, RET1L, RETL1, TRNR1, GDNF family receptor alpha 1
- External IDs: OMIM: 601496; MGI: 1100842; GeneCards: GFRA1

Gene location (Human)
Chr.	Chromosome 10 (human)
Band	10q25.3	Start	116,056,925 bp
Band	10q25.3	End	116,273,467 bp

Gene location (Mouse)
Chr.	Chromosome 19 (mouse)
Band	19 D2|19 54.18 cM	Start	58,224,036 bp
Band	19 D2|19 54.18 cM	End	58,444,341 bp
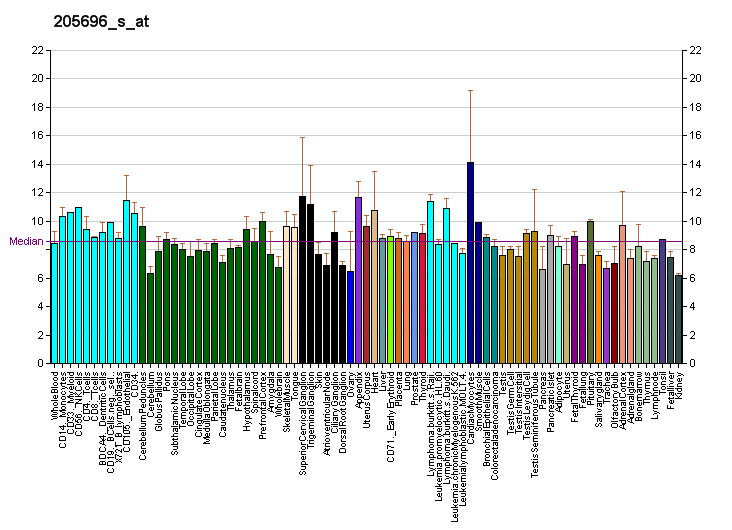
RNA expression pattern
Bgee	Human / Mouse (ortholog); Top expressed in: trigeminal ganglion; spinal ganglia; pars reticulata; parietal pleura; corpus epididymis; lactiferous duct; pars compacta; nipple; left uterine tube; cardia / Top expressed in: vestibular membrane of cochlear duct; habenula; facial motor nucleus; dentate gyrus of hippocampal formation granule cell; left lobe of liver; lateral septal nucleus; iris; medullary collecting duct; ciliary body; substantia nigra; More reference expression data
BioGPS	More reference expression data
Gene ontology
Molecular function	signaling receptor binding; glial cell-derived neurotrophic factor receptor activity; signaling receptor activity
Cellular component	anchored component of membrane; extracellular exosome; membrane; extrinsic component of membrane; intracellular anatomical structure; plasma membrane; external side of plasma membrane; receptor complex
Biological process	cell surface receptor signaling pathway; nervous system development; MAPK cascade; glial cell-derived neurotrophic factor receptor signaling pathway; axon guidance; regulation of molecular function
Sources:Amigo / QuickGO
Orthologs
Databases	NCBI: entry; OMA: entry
Species	Human	Mouse
Entrez	2674	14585
Ensembl	ENSG00000151892	ENSMUSG00000025089
UniProt	P56159	P97785
RefSeq (mRNA)	NM_001145453; NM_005264; NM_145793; NM_001348096; NM_001348098 NM_001348099	NM_001285457; NM_010279
RefSeq (protein)	NP_001138925; NP_005255; NP_665736; NP_001335025; NP_001335027 NP_001335028; NP_001369485; NP_001369486; NP_001369487; NP_001369488; NP_001369489; NP_001369490	NP_001272386; NP_034409
Location (UCSC)	Chr 10: 116.06 – 116.27 Mb	Chr 19: 58.22 – 58.44 Mb
PubMed search
- Wikidata
View/Edit Human	View/Edit Mouse

GDNF family receptor alpha-1 (GFRα1), also known as the GDNF receptor, is a protein that in humans is encoded by the GFRA1 gene.

== Function ==
Glial cell line-derived neurotrophic factor (GDNF) and neurturin (NTN) are two structurally related, potent neurotrophic factors that play key roles in the control of neuron survival and differentiation. The protein encoded by this gene is a member of the GDNF receptor family. It is a glycosylphosphatidylinositol(GPI)-linked cell surface receptor for both GDNF and NTN, and mediates activation of the RET tyrosine kinase receptor. This gene is a candidate gene for Hirschsprung disease. Two alternatively spliced transcript variants encoding different isoforms have been described for this gene.

== Interactions ==
GDNF family receptor alpha 1 has been shown to interact with GDNF and RET proto-oncogene.

== See also ==
- GFRα
