= Persephin =

Protein-coding gene in the species Homo sapiens

PSPN

Identifiers
- Aliases: PSPN, PSP, persephin
- External IDs: OMIM: 602921; MGI: 1201684; GeneCards: PSPN

Gene location (Human)
Chr.	Chromosome 19 (human)
Band	19p13.3	Start	6,375,148 bp
Band	19p13.3	End	6,379,058 bp

Gene location (Mouse)
Chr.	Chromosome 17 (mouse)
Band	17|17 D	Start	57,306,457 bp
Band	17|17 D	End	57,307,018 bp
RNA expression pattern
Bgee	Human / Mouse (ortholog); Top expressed in: gonad; tendon of biceps brachii; mucosa of transverse colon; ventricular zone; stromal cell of endometrium; ganglionic eminence; buccal mucosa cell; cerebellar hemisphere; right hemisphere of cerebellum; granulocyte / Top expressed in: embryo; embryo; morula; neural layer of retina; granulocyte; right ventricle; spermatocyte; lumbar subsegment of spinal cord; right kidney; lip; More reference expression data
BioGPS	n/a
Gene ontology
Molecular function	growth factor activity; signaling receptor binding
Cellular component	intracellular anatomical structure; extracellular region; extracellular space
Biological process	nervous system development; central nervous system development; MAPK cascade; axon guidance; regulation of signaling receptor activity
Sources:Amigo / QuickGO
Orthologs
Databases	NCBI: entry; OMA: entry
Species	Human	Mouse
Entrez	5623	19197
Ensembl	ENSG00000125650	ENSMUSG00000002664
UniProt	O60542	O70300
RefSeq (mRNA)	NM_004158	NM_008954
RefSeq (protein)	NP_004149	NP_032980
Location (UCSC)	Chr 19: 6.38 – 6.38 Mb	Chr 17: 57.31 – 57.31 Mb
PubMed search
- Wikidata
View/Edit Human	View/Edit Mouse

persephin

Identifiers
- Symbol: PSPN
- NCBI gene: 5623
- HGNC: 9579
- OMIM: 602921
- RefSeq: NM_004158
- UniProt: O60542

Other data
- Locus: Chr. 19 p13.3
Search for
- Structures: Swiss-model
- Domains: InterPro

Persephin is a neurotrophic factor in the glial cell line-derived neurotrophic factor (GDNF) family. Persephin shares around a 40% similarity in amino acid sequence compared to GDNF and neurturin, two members of the GDNF family.

== Function ==
Persephin has been found to be less potent than other members of the GDNF family. It has been found to support the survival and morphological differentiation of tyrosine hydroxylase immunoreactive neurons, although less so than both GDNF and neurturin. The mRNA levels of persephin in developing neurons has been low compared to other neurotrophic factors, but relatively higher levels of persephin mRNA have been found in embryonic neurons.

Similarly to the other members of the GDNF family of ligands, persephin uses a receptor that consists of the tyrosine kinase signaling component Ret and a unit of glycosylphosphatidylinsitol (GPI)-anchored receptor (GFRα). Persephin specifically binds to GFRα4.

Persephin acts on both neurons in the CNS and PNS, but also has the ability to act as a renal ramogen.

== Structure ==
Unlike other GDNF family of ligands, persephin only contains one RXXR cleavage site, rather than multiple, indicating that it can only make one length of functional peptide.

== Therapeutics ==
Persephin has the potential to be used as a therapeutic treatment for neurodegenerative diseases, such as Parkinson's disease and other diseases that affect motor neurons. Because persephin acts more selectively compared to other GFLs, such as GDNF, it may produce fewer mechanism-based complications, making it a stronger therapeutic target.
