= Artemin =

Protein found in humans

ARTN
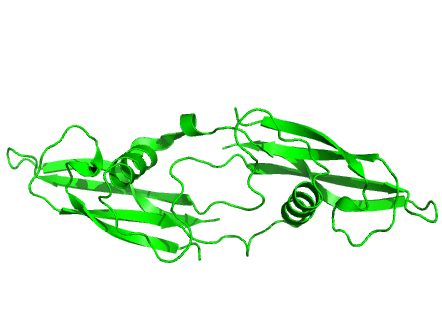

Identifiers
- Aliases: ARTN, ENOVIN, EVN, NBN, artemin, ART
- External IDs: OMIM: 603886; MGI: 1333791; GeneCards: ARTN
Available structures
| PDB | Ortholog search: PDBe RCSB |
| PDB | List of PDB id codes 2ASK, 2GH0, 2GYR, 2GYZ |

Gene location (Human)
| Chr. | Chromosome 1 (human) |
| Band | 1p34.1 | Start | 43,933,320 bp |
| Band | 1p34.1 | End | 43,937,240 bp |

Gene location (Mouse)
| Chr. | Chromosome 4 (mouse) |
| Band | 4|4 D1 | Start | 117,783,359 bp |
| Band | 4|4 D1 | End | 117,786,960 bp |
RNA expression pattern
| Bgee | Human / Mouse (ortholog); Top expressed in: testicle; triceps brachii muscle; mucosa of transverse colon; trachea; gastric mucosa; pituitary gland; pericardium; prostate; anterior pituitary; pons / Top expressed in: embryo; seminiferous tubule; spermatid; vas deferens; embryo; zygote; transitional epithelium of urinary bladder; morula; right kidney; cornea; More reference expression data |
| BioGPS | n/a |
Gene ontology
| Molecular function | growth factor activity; signaling receptor binding; protein binding |
| Cellular component | extracellular region; intracellular anatomical structure; extracellular space |
| Biological process | induction of positive chemotaxis; neuroblast proliferation; lymphocyte migration into lymphoid organs; peripheral nervous system development; signal transduction; Peyer's patch morphogenesis; MAPK cascade; axon guidance; regulation of signaling receptor activity |
Sources:Amigo / QuickGO
Orthologs
| Databases | NCBI: entry; OMA: entry |
| Species | Human | Mouse |
| Entrez | 9048 | 11876 |
| Ensembl | ENSG00000117407 | ENSMUSG00000028539 |
| UniProt | Q5T4W7 | Q9Z0L2 |
| RefSeq (mRNA) | NM_001136215; NM_003976; NM_057090; NM_057091; NM_057160 | NM_009711; NM_001284191; NM_001284192; NM_001284193 |
| RefSeq (protein) | NP_001129687; NP_476431; NP_476432 | NP_001271120; NP_001271121; NP_001271122; NP_033841 |
| Location (UCSC) | Chr 1: 43.93 – 43.94 Mb | Chr 4: 117.78 – 117.79 Mb |
| PubMed search |
- Wikidata
| View/Edit Human | View/Edit Mouse |

Artemin, also known as enovin or neublastin, is a protein that in humans is encoded by the ARTN gene.

== Function ==
Artemin is a neurotrophic factor in the glial cell line-derived neurotrophic factor family of ligands which are a group of ligands within the TGF-beta superfamily of signaling molecules. GDNFs are unique in having neurotrophic properties and have potential use for gene therapy in neurodegenerative disease. Artemin has been shown in culture to support the survival of a number of peripheral neuron populations and at least one population of dopaminergic CNS neurons. Its role in the PNS and CNS is further substantiated by its expression pattern in the proximity of these neurons. This protein is a ligand for the RET receptor and uses GFR-alpha 3 as a coreceptor.

== Role in axonal development ==
Artemin, along with other GDNF family of ligands, has been implicated in the structural development and plasticity of several types of neurons, including ventral mesencephalic dopaminergic neurons. Artemin promotes the survival of newly differentiated neurons after they have undergone terminal mitosis. Artemin has also been found to support the survival neurons in later stages of development and can enhance neuron growth better than neural growth factor during later stages of development. Artemin plays an important role in migration, proliferation, and differentiation of sympathetic neurons during development. However, during target innervation, sympathetic neurons become dependent on neural growth factor for survival support.

Unlike other secreted guidance cues during development, artemin acts solely as a chemoattractant and never acts as a chemorepellent. Artemin is expressed in smooth muscle cells and secreted along blood vessels and in cells near sympathetic axonal projections so that the sympathetic axons can reach their target tissue cells.
