= GFRA4 =

Protein-coding gene in the species Homo sapiens

Identifiers
- Aliases: GFRA4, GDNF family receptor alpha 4
- External IDs: MGI: 1341873; GeneCards: GFRA4

Gene location (Human)
Chr.	Chromosome 20 (human)
Band	20p13	Start	3,659,248 bp
Band	20p13	End	3,663,399 bp

Gene location (Mouse)
Chr.	Chromosome 2 (mouse)
Band	2 F1|2 63.26 cM	Start	130,881,552 bp
Band	2 F1|2 63.26 cM	End	130,885,008 bp
RNA expression pattern
Bgee	Human / Mouse (ortholog); Top expressed in: testicle; gonad; periodontal fiber; right lobe of thyroid gland; prefrontal cortex; left lobe of thyroid gland; amygdala; hippocampus proper; Brodmann area 9; kidney / Top expressed in: urinary bladder; striatum of neuraxis; superior frontal gyrus; primary visual cortex; hippocampus proper; dentate gyrus of hippocampal formation granule cell; olfactory bulb; substantia nigra; spermatocyte; thyroid gland; More reference expression data
BioGPS	n/a
Gene ontology
Molecular function	glial cell-derived neurotrophic factor receptor activity; signaling receptor activity
Cellular component	extracellular region; membrane; anchored component of membrane; plasma membrane; intracellular anatomical structure; extracellular space; external side of plasma membrane; receptor complex
Biological process	negative regulation of ossification; glial cell-derived neurotrophic factor receptor signaling pathway; MAPK cascade; axon guidance; nervous system development
Sources:Amigo / QuickGO
Orthologs
Databases	NCBI: entry; OMA: entry
Species	Human	Mouse
Entrez	64096	14588
Ensembl	ENSG00000125861	ENSMUSG00000027316
UniProt	Q9GZZ7	Q9JJT2
RefSeq (mRNA)	NM_022139; NM_145762; NM_145763	NM_001136063; NM_001271001; NM_001271002; NM_020014
RefSeq (protein)	NP_071422; NP_665705	NP_001129535; NP_001257930; NP_001257931; NP_064398; NP_001394167 NP_001394168
Location (UCSC)	Chr 20: 3.66 – 3.66 Mb	Chr 2: 130.88 – 130.89 Mb
PubMed search
- Wikidata
View/Edit Human	View/Edit Mouse

GDNF family receptor alpha-4 (GFRα4), also known as the persephin receptor, is a protein that in humans is encoded by the GFRA4 gene.

== See also ==
- GFRα
