= GFRA3 =

Protein-coding gene in the species Homo sapiens

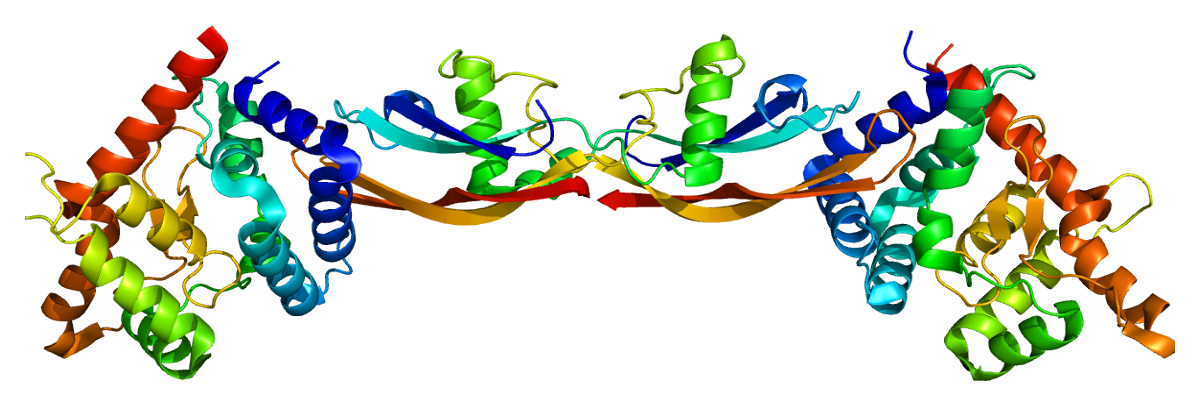

Identifiers
- Aliases: GFRA3, GDNFR3, GDNF family receptor alpha 3
- External IDs: OMIM: 605710; MGI: 1201403; GeneCards: GFRA3
Available structures
PDB	Ortholog search: PDBe RCSB
PDB	List of PDB id codes 2GH0

Gene location (Human)
Chr.	Chromosome 5 (human)
Band	5q31.2	Start	138,252,380 bp
Band	5q31.2	End	138,274,621 bp

Gene location (Mouse)
Chr.	Chromosome 18 (mouse)
Band	18|18 B1	Start	34,822,951 bp
Band	18|18 B1	End	34,853,440 bp
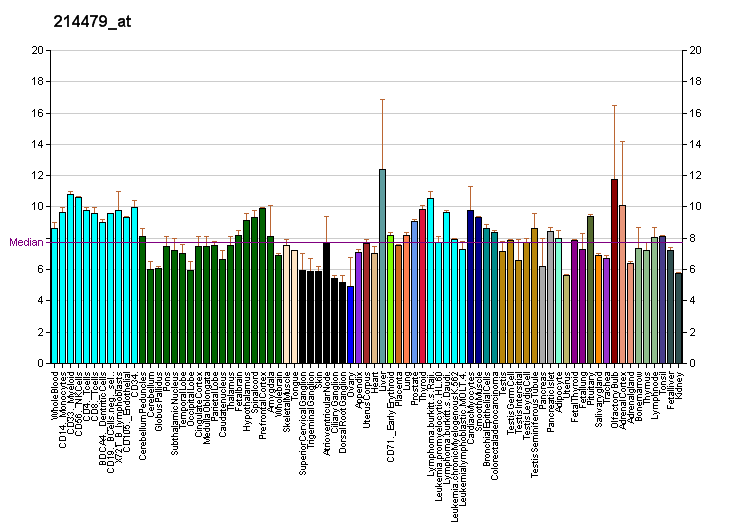
RNA expression pattern
Bgee	Human / Mouse (ortholog); Top expressed in: spinal ganglia; trigeminal ganglion; tibial nerve; testicle; sural nerve; gonad; muscle layer of sigmoid colon; vena cava; seminal vesicula; mucosa of transverse colon / Top expressed in: lumbar spinal ganglion; trigeminal ganglion; superior cervical ganglion; external carotid artery; embryo; urethra; female urethra; male urethra; internal carotid artery; carotid body; More reference expression data
BioGPS	More reference expression data
Gene ontology
Molecular function	signaling receptor binding; axon guidance receptor activity; protein binding; signaling receptor activity
Cellular component	membrane; anchored component of membrane; external side of plasma membrane; extrinsic component of membrane; plasma membrane; cytosol; receptor complex
Biological process	neuron development; neuron migration; peripheral nervous system development; sympathetic nervous system development; signal transduction; nervous system development; MAPK cascade; axon guidance
Sources:Amigo / QuickGO
Orthologs
Databases	NCBI: entry; OMA: entry
Species	Human	Mouse
Entrez	2676	14587
Ensembl	ENSG00000146013	ENSMUSG00000024366
UniProt	O60609	O35118
RefSeq (mRNA)	NM_001496	NM_010280
RefSeq (protein)	NP_001487	NP_034410
Location (UCSC)	Chr 5: 138.25 – 138.27 Mb	Chr 18: 34.82 – 34.85 Mb
PubMed search
- Wikidata
View/Edit Human	View/Edit Mouse

GDNF family receptor alpha-3 (GFRα3), also known as the artemin receptor, is a protein that in humans is encoded by the GFRA3 gene.

== Function ==
The protein encoded by this gene is a glycosylphosphatidylinositol(GPI)-linked cell surface receptor and a member of the GDNF receptor family. It forms a signaling receptor complex with RET tyrosine kinase receptor and binds the artemin ligand.

In mouse models of osteoarthritis, GFRα3 was upregulated in sensory nerves. Treating arthritic mice with monoclonal antibodies that bind to GFRα3 prevents artemin from binding there and signaling pain. Treated mice were able to use their limbs again two hours post-treatment.

== See also ==
- GFRα
