= RET proto-oncogene =

Mammalian protein

RET

Identifiers
- Aliases: RET, Ret, PTC, RET51, RET9, c-Ret, CDHF12, CDHR16, HSCR1, MEN2A, MEN2B, MTC1, RET-ELE1, ret proto-oncogene
- External IDs: OMIM: 164761; MGI: 97902; GeneCards: RET
Available structures
| PDB | Ortholog search: PDBe RCSB |
| PDB | List of PDB id codes 2IVS, 2IVT, 2IVU, 2IVV, 2X2K, 2X2L, 2X2M, 2X2U, 4CKI, 4CKJ, 4UX8, 5AMN |
Enzyme activity
| EC # | BRENDA | ExPASy | KEGG | MetaCyc |
|---|---|---|---|---|
| 2.7.10.1 | ↗ | ↗ | ↗ | ↗ |

Gene location (Human)
| Chr. | Chromosome 10 (human) |
| Band | 10q11.21 | Start | 43,077,064 bp |
| Band | 10q11.21 | End | 43,130,351 bp |

Gene location (Mouse)
| Chr. | Chromosome 6 (mouse) |
| Band | 6 F1|6 55.86 cM | Start | 118,128,706 bp |
| Band | 6 F1|6 55.86 cM | End | 118,174,679 bp |
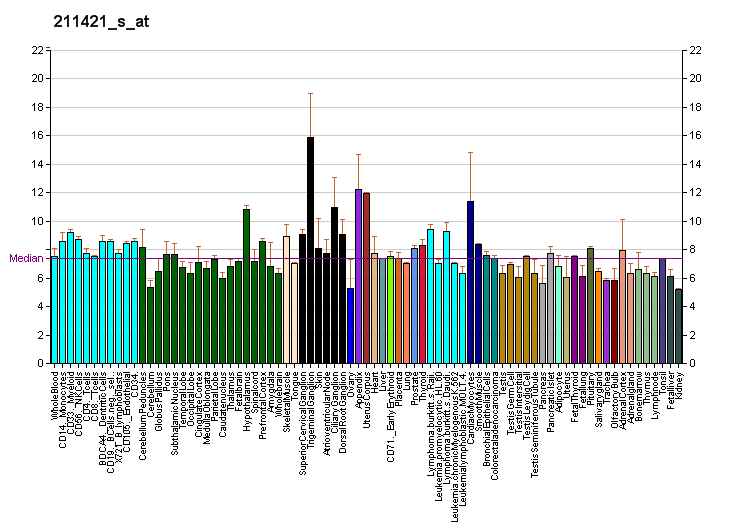

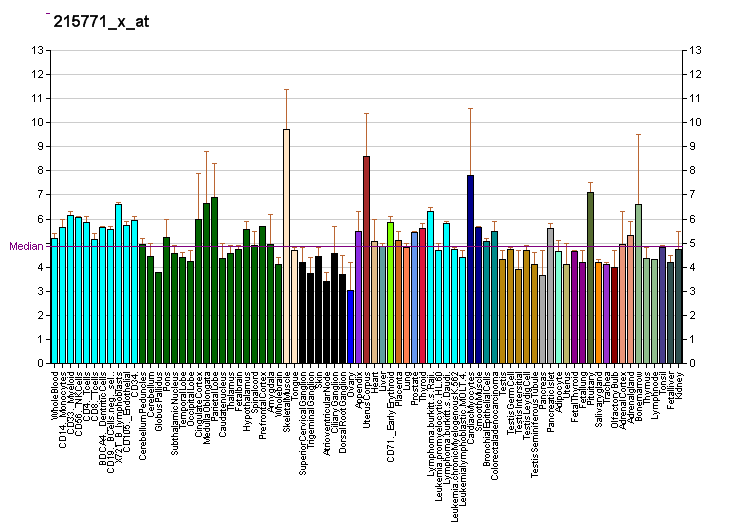

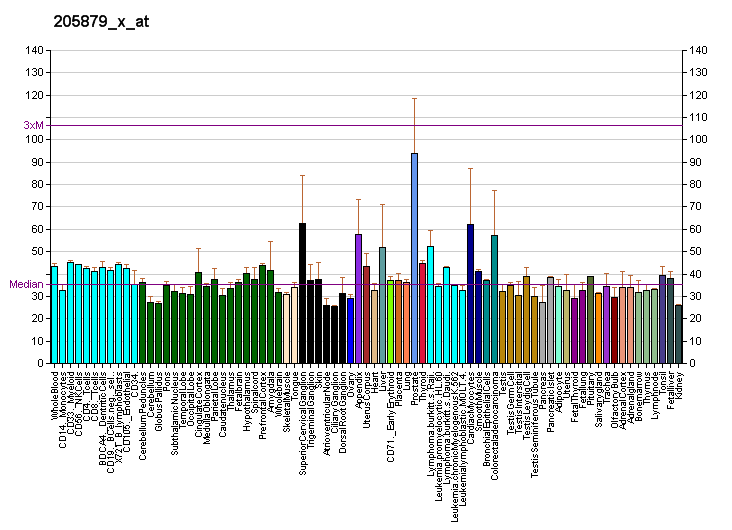
RNA expression pattern
| Bgee | Human / Mouse (ortholog); Top expressed in: pars reticulata; spinal ganglia; pars compacta; trigeminal ganglion; gonad; testicle; pons; tibialis anterior muscle; lateral nuclear group of thalamus; muscle of thigh / Top expressed in: ventral tegmental area; substantia nigra; facial motor nucleus; enteric nervous system; lumbar spinal ganglion; submandibular gland; trigeminal ganglion; anterior horn of spinal cord; medial vestibular nucleus; thyroid gland; More reference expression data |
| BioGPS | More reference expression data |
Gene ontology
| Molecular function | transferase activity; nucleotide binding; calcium ion binding; protein kinase activity; kinase activity; protein binding; protein tyrosine kinase activity; ATP binding; signaling receptor activity; transmembrane receptor protein tyrosine kinase activity; receptor tyrosine kinase; transmembrane signaling receptor activity |
| Cellular component | integral component of membrane; endosome; intracellular membrane-bounded organelle; membrane; receptor complex; integral component of plasma membrane; axon; soma; dendrite; early endosome; membrane raft; endosome membrane; plasma membrane; cytosol; plasma membrane protein complex; cytoplasm |
| Biological process | cellular response to retinoic acid; ureteric bud development; embryonic epithelial tube formation; membrane protein proteolysis; phosphorylation; transmembrane receptor protein tyrosine kinase signaling pathway; positive regulation of cell migration; neuron cell-cell adhesion; nervous system development; neuron maturation; positive regulation of metanephric glomerulus development; positive regulation of transcription, DNA-templated; regulation of axonogenesis; protein phosphorylation; enteric nervous system development; positive regulation of extrinsic apoptotic signaling pathway in absence of ligand; regulation of cell adhesion; lymphocyte migration into lymphoid organs; cell adhesion; positive regulation of gene expression; ureter maturation; response to pain; retina development in camera-type eye; neural crest cell migration; neuron differentiation; positive regulation of cell size; positive regulation of neuron projection development; posterior midgut development; positive regulation of cell adhesion mediated by integrin; innervation; positive regulation of neuron maturation; activation of cysteine-type endopeptidase activity involved in apoptotic process; signal transduction; homophilic cell adhesion via plasma membrane adhesion molecules; Peyer's patch morphogenesis; peptidyl-tyrosine phosphorylation; MAPK cascade; axon guidance; positive regulation of peptidyl-serine phosphorylation of STAT protein; glial cell-derived neurotrophic factor receptor signaling pathway; positive regulation of MAPK cascade; positive regulation of protein kinase B signaling; negative regulation of signal transduction; cell differentiation; negative regulation of apoptotic process; positive regulation of ERK1 and ERK2 cascade; neurogenesis |
Sources:Amigo / QuickGO
Orthologs
| Databases | NCBI: entry; OMA: entry |
| Species | Human | Mouse |
| Entrez | 5979 | 19713 |
| Ensembl | ENSG00000165731 | ENSMUSG00000030110 |
| UniProt | P07949 | P35546 |
| RefSeq (mRNA) | NM_000323; NM_020629; NM_020630; NM_020975; NM_001355216 | NM_001080780; NM_009050 |
| RefSeq (protein) | NP_065681; NP_066124; NP_001342145; NP_066124.1 | NP_001074249; NP_033076 |
| Location (UCSC) | Chr 10: 43.08 – 43.13 Mb | Chr 6: 118.13 – 118.17 Mb |
| PubMed search |
- Wikidata
| View/Edit Human | View/Edit Mouse |

The RET proto-oncogene encodes a receptor tyrosine kinase for members of the glial cell line-derived neurotrophic factor (GDNF) family of extracellular signalling molecules. RET loss of function mutations are associated with the development of Hirschsprung's disease, while gain of function mutations are associated with the development of various types of human cancer, including papillary thyroid carcinoma, multiple endocrine neoplasias type 2A and 2B, pheochromocytoma and parathyroid hyperplasia.

== Structure ==
RET is an abbreviation for "rearranged during transfection", as the DNA sequence of this gene was originally found to be rearranged within a 3T3 fibroblast cell line following its transfection with DNA taken from human lymphoma cells. The human gene RET is localized to chromosome 10 (10q11.2) and contains 21 exons.

The natural alternative splicing of the RET gene results in the production of 3 different isoforms of the protein RET. RET51, RET43 and RET9 contain 51, 43 and 9 amino acids in their C-terminal tail respectively. The biological roles of isoforms RET51 and RET9 are the most well studied in-vivo as these are the most common isoforms in which RET occurs.

Common to each isoform is a domain structure. Each protein is divided into three domains: an N-terminal extracellular domain with four cadherin-like repeats and a cysteine-rich region, a hydrophobic transmembrane domain and a cytoplasmic tyrosine kinase domain, which is split by an insertion of 27 amino acids. Within the cytoplasmic tyrosine kinase domain, there are 16 tyrosines (Tyrs) in RET9 and 18 in RET51. Tyr1090 and Tyr1096 are present only in the RET51 isoform.

The extracellular domain of RET contains nine N-glycosylation sites. The fully glycosylated RET protein is reported to have a molecular weight of 170 kDa although it is not clear to which isoform this molecular weight relates.

== Kinase activation ==
RET is the receptor for GDNF-family ligands (GFLs).

In order to activate RET, GFLs first need to form a complex with a glycosylphosphatidylinositol (GPI)-anchored co-receptor. The co-receptors themselves are classified as members of the GDNF receptor-α (GFRα) protein family. Different members of the GFRα family (GFRα1, GFRα2, GFRα3, GFRα4) exhibit a specific binding activity for a specific GFLs. Upon GFL-GFRα complex formation, the complex then brings together two molecules of RET, triggering trans-autophosphorylation of specific tyrosine residues within the tyrosine kinase domain of each RET molecule. Tyr900 and Tyr905 within the activation loop (A-loop) of the kinase domain have been shown to be autophosphorylation sites by mass spectrometry. Phosphorylation of Tyr905 stabilizes the active conformation of the kinase, which, in turn, results in the autophosphorylation of other tyrosine residues mainly located in the C-terminal tail region of the molecule.

RET dimer taken from crystal structure 2IVT

The structure shown to the left was taken from the protein data bank code 2IVT. The structure is that of a dimer formed between two protein molecules each spanning amino acids 703-1012 of the RET molecule, covering RETs intracellular tyrosine kinase domain. One protein molecule, molecule A is shown in yellow and the other, molecule B in grey. The activation loop is coloured purple and selected tyrosine residues in green. Part of the activation loop from molecule B is absent.

Phosphorylation of Tyr981 and the additional tyrosines Tyr1015, Tyr1062 and Tyr1096, not covered by the above structure, have been shown to be important to the initiation of intracellular signal transduction processes.

== Role of RET signalling during development ==
Mice deficient in GDNF, GFRα1 or the RET protein itself exhibit severe defects in kidney and enteric nervous system development. This implicates RET signal transduction as key to the development of normal kidneys and the enteric nervous system.

== Clinical relevance ==
At least 26 disease-causing mutations in this gene have been discovered. Activating point mutations in RET can give rise to the hereditary cancer syndrome known as multiple endocrine neoplasia type 2 (MEN 2). There are three subtypes based on clinical presentation: MEN 2A, MEN 2B, and familial medullary thyroid carcinoma (FMTC). There is a high degree of correlation between the position of the point mutation and the phenotype of the disease.

Chromosomal rearrangements that generate a fusion gene, resulting in the juxtaposition of the C-terminal region of the RET protein with an N-terminal portion of another protein, can also lead to constitutive activation of the RET kinase. These types of rearrangements are primarily associated with papillary thyroid carcinoma (PTC) where they represent 10-20% of cases, and non-small cell lung cancer (NSCLC) where they represent 2% of cases. Several fusion partners have been described in the literature, and the most common ones across both cancer types include KIF5B, CCDC6 and NCOA4.

While older multikinase inhibitors such as cabozantinib or vandetanib showed modest efficacy in targeting RET-driven malignancies, newer selective inhibitors (such as selpercatinib and pralsetinib) have shown significant activity in both mutations and fusions. The results of the LIBRETTO-001 trial studying selpercatinib showed a progression-free survival of 17.5 months in previously treated RET-positive NSCLC, and 22 months for RET-positive thyroid cancers, which prompted an FDA approval for both these indications in May 2020. Several other selective RET inhibitors are under development, including TPX-0046, a macrocyclic inhibitor of RET and Src intended to inhibit mutations providing resistance to current inhibitors.

== Disease database ==
The RET gene variant database at the University of Utah, identifies (as of November 2014) 166 mutations that are implicated in MEN2.

== Interactions ==
RET proto-oncogene has been shown to interact with:

- DOK1,
- DOK5,
- GDNF family receptor alpha 1,
- GRB10,
- GRB7,
- Grb2,
- SHC1, and
- STAT3.
