= Neurturin =

Mammalian protein found in Homo sapiens

NRTN

Identifiers
- Aliases: NRTN, NTN, neurturin
- External IDs: OMIM: 602018; MGI: 108417; GeneCards: NRTN

Gene location (Human)
Chr.	Chromosome 19 (human)
Band	19p13.3	Start	5,805,067 bp
Band	19p13.3	End	5,828,324 bp

Gene location (Mouse)
Chr.	Chromosome 17 (mouse)
Band	17 D|17 29.49 cM	Start	57,058,325 bp
Band	17 D|17 29.49 cM	End	57,064,530 bp
RNA expression pattern
Bgee	Human / Mouse (ortholog); Top expressed in: apex of heart; right auricle of heart; left ventricle; body of pancreas; right lobe of liver; testicle; muscle layer of sigmoid colon; body of stomach; amniotic fluid; left adrenal cortex / Top expressed in: vestibular membrane of cochlear duct; right kidney; lip; choroid plexus of fourth ventricle; lactiferous gland; embryo; skin of abdomen; proximal tubule; vestibular sensory epithelium; muscle of thigh; More reference expression data
BioGPS	n/a
Gene ontology
Molecular function	growth factor activity; signaling receptor binding
Cellular component	axon; extracellular region; intracellular anatomical structure
Biological process	neuron projection development; nerve development; neural crest cell migration; nervous system development; MAPK cascade; transmembrane receptor protein tyrosine kinase signaling pathway; axon guidance; regulation of signaling receptor activity
Sources:Amigo / QuickGO
Orthologs
Databases	NCBI: entry; OMA: entry
Species	Human	Mouse
Entrez	4902	18188
Ensembl	ENSG00000171119	ENSMUSG00000039481
UniProt	Q99748	P97463
RefSeq (mRNA)	NM_004558	NM_008738
RefSeq (protein)	NP_004549	NP_032764
Location (UCSC)	Chr 19: 5.81 – 5.83 Mb	Chr 17: 57.06 – 57.06 Mb
PubMed search
- Wikidata
View/Edit Human	View/Edit Mouse

Neurturin

Identifiers
- Symbol: NRTN
- Alt. symbols: NTN
- NCBI gene: 4902
- HGNC: 8007
- OMIM: 602018
- RefSeq: NM_004558
- UniProt: Q99748

Other data
- Locus: Chr. 19 p13.3
Search for
- Structures: Swiss-model
- Domains: InterPro

Neurturin (NRTN) is a protein that is encoded in humans by the NRTN gene. Neurturin belongs to the glial cell line-derived neurotrophic factor (GDNF) family of neurotrophic factors, which regulate the survival and function of neurons. Neurturin's role as a growth factor places it in the transforming growth factor beta (TGF-beta) subfamily along with its homologs persephin, artemin, and GDNF. It shares a 42% similarity in amino acid sequence with mature GDNF. It is also considered a trophic factor and critical in the development and growth of neurons in the brain. Neurotrophic factors like neurturin have been tested in several clinical trial settings for the potential treatment of the neurodegenerative disease Parkinson's disease.

== Function ==
Neurturin is encoded for by the NRTN gene located on chromosome 19 in humans and has been shown to promote potent effects on survival and function of developing and mature midbrain dopaminergic neurons in vitro. In vivo the direct administration of neurturin into the substantia nigra of mice models also shows mature dopamine neuron protection. In addition, neurturin has also been shown to support the survival of several other neurons including sympathetic and sensory neurons of the dorsal root ganglia. Knockout mice have shown that neurturin does not appear essential for survival. However, evidence shows retarded growth of enteric, sensory and parasympathetic neurons in mice upon the removal of neurturin receptors.

== Mechanism of activation ==
Neurturin signaling is mediated by the activation of a multi-component receptor system including the ret tyrosine kinase (RET), a cell-surface bound GDNF family receptor-α (GFRα) protein, and a glycosyl phosphatidylinositol (GPI)-linked protein. Neurturin preferentially binds to the GFRα2 co-receptor. Upon assembly of the complex, specific tyrosine residues are phosphorylated within two molecules of RET that are brought together to initiate signal transduction and the MAP kinase signaling pathway.

== Interactions ==
Neurturin has been shown to upregulate B1 (bradykinin) receptors in neurons of mice, indicating a possible influence on pain and inflammation pathways. In addition knockout mice have shown that in the absence of neurturin an increased acetylcholine response is observed. The exact role and function of neurturin in multiple signaling pathways is widely unknown.

== Role in disease ==
The most studied is neurturin's role in neurodegenerative disease like Parkinson's disease and Huntington's, where several rat studies have implicated neurturin's role in rescuing neurons. However, these results have never been observed in humans. Hirschsprung disease, an autosomal dominant genetic disorder, is characterized by complete absence of neuronal ganglion cells from the intestinal tract. Previous studies indicate a role of NRTN gene mutations in the disease. One study showed evidence that a mutation in the NRTN gene was not enough alone to cause onset of the disease, however when coupled with a mutation in the RET gene, disease was present in family members as well as the individual. A more recent study showed NRTN variants present in individuals with Hirschsprung disease. However, RET associated mutations were not found and in one variant, RET phosphorylation levels were reduced, which has the potential to have downstream effects on the proliferation and differentiation of neuronal crests. Also, high levels of expression of neurturin were found to be associated with nephroblastoma indicating the possible that the growth factor could be influencing differentiation. Lastly, a study also associated neurturin deficiency in mice with keratoconjunctivitis and dry eye.

== Therapeutic potential ==
Evidence showing neurturin's role in neuron survival and management has made it a popular candidate for the potential treatment or reversal of neurodegeneration. In addition, mice models have shown the dying neurons exposed to trophic factors can be rescued. Neurturin is an example of a trophic factor that is difficult to utilize clinically because of its inability to cross the blood-brain barrier of the CNS (central nervous system). Ceregene sponsored a double-blind phase II clinical trial of CERE-120, a viral vector mediated gene transfer drug that allows for the continuous delivery of neurturin to the nigrostratial system. The hope was to reverse damaged and diseased tissue in Parkinson's patients and overall slow the progression of the disease. However, results were inconclusive and showed that while the drug appears to be relatively safe, there was no statistically significant data supporting the improvement of motor function or neuronal health. Neurturin's therapeutic potential is unknown and future studies aim to improve delivery of the drug.
