= Neuregulin 3 =

Protein-coding gene in Homo sapiens

NRG3

Identifiers
- Aliases: NRG3, HRG3, pro-neuregulin 3
- External IDs: OMIM: 605533; MGI: 1097165; GeneCards: NRG3

Gene location (Human)
Chr.	Chromosome 10 (human)
Band	10q23.1	Start	81,875,194 bp
Band	10q23.1	End	82,987,179 bp

Gene location (Mouse)
Chr.	Chromosome 14 (mouse)
Band	14|14 B	Start	38,090,909 bp
Band	14|14 B	End	39,195,045 bp
RNA expression pattern
Bgee	Human / Mouse (ortholog); Top expressed in: endothelial cell; middle temporal gyrus; Brodmann area 23; prefrontal cortex; dorsolateral prefrontal cortex; Brodmann area 9; cingulate gyrus; anterior cingulate cortex; primary visual cortex; gonad / Top expressed in: lumbar spinal ganglion; barrel cortex; supraoptic nucleus; Region I of hippocampus proper; primary visual cortex; superior frontal gyrus; dentate gyrus of hippocampal formation granule cell; substantia nigra; medial geniculate nucleus; trigeminal ganglion; More reference expression data
BioGPS	n/a
Gene ontology
Molecular function	receptor tyrosine kinase binding; growth factor activity; transmembrane receptor protein tyrosine kinase activator activity; chemorepellent activity; signaling receptor binding
Cellular component	integral component of membrane; extracellular region; plasma membrane; integral component of plasma membrane; intracellular anatomical structure; membrane; extracellular space; glutamatergic synapse
Biological process	pattern specification process; mammary placode formation; chemorepulsion involved in interneuron migration from the subpallium to the cortex; negative regulation of neuron migration; regulation of cell growth; mammary gland development; activation of transmembrane receptor protein tyrosine kinase activity; intracellular signal transduction; animal organ development; regulation of signaling receptor activity; nervous system development; modulation of chemical synaptic transmission
Sources:Amigo / QuickGO
Orthologs
Databases	NCBI: entry; OMA: entry
Species	Human	Mouse
Entrez	10718	18183
Ensembl	ENSG00000185737	ENSMUSG00000041014
UniProt	P56975	O35181
RefSeq (mRNA)	NM_001010848; NM_001165972; NM_001165973; NM_001370081; NM_001370082 NM_001370083; NM_001370084	NM_001190187; NM_001190188; NM_008734
RefSeq (protein)	NP_001010848; NP_001159444; NP_001159445; NP_001357010; NP_001357011 NP_001357012; NP_001357013	NP_001177116; NP_001177117; NP_032760
Location (UCSC)	Chr 10: 81.88 – 82.99 Mb	Chr 14: 38.09 – 39.2 Mb
PubMed search
- Wikidata
View/Edit Human	View/Edit Mouse

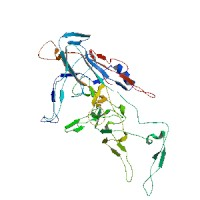
Tertiary structure of NRG3

Neuregulin 3, also known as NRG3, is a neural-enriched member of the neuregulin protein family which in humans is encoded by the NRG3 gene. The NRGs are a group of signaling proteins part of the superfamily of epidermal growth factor, EGF like polypeptide growth factor. These groups of proteins possess an 'EGF-like domain' that consists of six cysteine residues and three disulfide bridges predicted by the consensus sequence of the cysteine residues.

The neuregulins are a diverse family of proteins formed through alternative splicing from a single gene; they play crucial roles in regulating the growth and differentiation of epithelial, glial and muscle cells. These groups of proteins also aid cell-cell associations in the breast, heart and skeletal muscles. Four different kinds of neuregulin genes have been identified, namely: NRG1 NRG2 NRG3 and NRG4. While the NRG1 isoforms have been extensively studied, there is little information available about the other genes of the family. NRGs bind to the ERBB3 and ERBB4 tyrosine kinase receptors; they then form homodimers or heterodimers, often consisting of ERBB2, which is thought to function as a co-receptor as it has not been observed to bind any ligand. NRGs bind to the ERBB receptors to promote phosphorylation of specific tyrosine residues on the C-terminal link of the receptor and the interactions of intracellular signaling proteins.

NRGs also play significant roles in developing, maintaining, and repair of the nervous system; this is because NRG1, NRG2 and NRG3 are widely expressed in the central nervous system and also in the olfactory system. Studies have observed that in mice, NRG3 is limited to the developing Central nervous system as well as the adult form; previous studies also highlight the roles of NRG1, ERBB2, and ERBB4 in the development of the heart. Mice deficient in ERBB2, ERBB4, or NRG1 were observed to die at the mid-embryogenesis stage from the termination of myocardial trabeculae development in the ventricle. These results confirm that NRG1 expression in the endocardium is a significant ligand required to activate expression of ERBB2 and ERBB4 in the myocardium.

== Function ==
Neuregulins are ligands of the ERBB-family receptors, while NRG1 and NRG2 are able to bind and activate both ERBB3 and ERBB4, NRG3 binding stimulates tyrosine phosphorylation, and can only bind to the extracellular domain of the ERBB4 receptor tyrosine kinase but not to the other members of the ERBB family receptors; ERBB2 and ERBB3.

NRG1, plays critical roles in the development of the embryonic cerebral cortex when it controls migration and sequencing of the cortical cell. Contrary to NRG1, there is limited information on pre-mRNA splicing of the NRG3 gene, together with its transcriptional profile and function in the brain. The recent discovery of hFBNRG3 (human fetal brain NRG3; DQ857894) which is an alternative cloned isoform of NRG3 from human fetal brain, promotes the survival of oligodendrocyte with the aid of ERBB4/PI3K/AKT1 pathway and also partakes in NRG3-ERBB4 signaling in neurodevelopment and brain functionalities.

Even though studies have revealed that NRG1 and NRG3 are paralogues, the EGF domain of NRG3 is only 31% identical to NRG1. The N-terminal domain of NRG3 resembles that of Sensory And Motor Neuron Derived Factor; SMDF because it lacks Ig-like as well as Kringle-like domains that are attributed to many NRG1 isomers. Hydropathy profile studies have shown that NRG3 lacks a hydrophobic N-terminal signal sequence common in secreted proteins, but contains a region of non-polar or uncharged amino acids in position (W66–V91). An amino acid region found in SMDF is similar to this non polar site of NRG3 and has been proposed to act as an internal, uncleaved signal sequence that functions as a translocation agent across the endoplasmic reticulum membrane.

== Clinical significance ==
Recent human genetic studies reveals neuregulin 3 gene (NRG3) as a potential risk gene responsible for different kinds of neuro-developmental disorders, resulting to schizophrenia, stunted development, attention deficit related disorders and bipolar disorders when structural and genetic variations occur within the gene

Most importantly, variants of the NRG3 gene have been linked to a susceptibility to schizophrenia. An increase in Isoform-specific models of NRG3 involved in schizophrenia have been reported, and observed to have an interaction with rs10748842; a NRG3 risk polymorphism, which indicates that NRG3 transcriptional dysregulation is a molecular risk mechanism.

These isoforms have also been linked to Hirschsprung's disease.

=== Schizophrenia ===
Several genes in the NRG-ERBB signaling pathway have been implicated in genetic predisposition to schizophrenia, Neuregulin 3 (NRG3) encodes a protein similar to its paralog NRG1 and both play important roles in the developing nervous system. As observed with other pathologies like autism and schizophrenia, several members of any given protein family have a high chance of association with the same phenotype, individually or together.

A recent study of the temporal, diagnostic, and tissue-specific modulation of NRG3 isoform expression in human brain development, employed the use of qRT-PCR; quantitative polymerase chain reaction to quantify 4 classes of NRG3 in human postmortem dorsolateral prefrontal cortex from 286 normal and affected (bipolar or extreme depressive disorder) candidates with age range of 14 weeks to 85 years old. The researches observed that each the 4 isoform class (I-IV) of NRG3 showed unique expression trajectories across human neopallium development and aging.

- NRG3 class I was increased in bipolar and major depressive disorder, in agreement with observations in schizophrenia.
- NRG3 class II was increased in bipolar disorder, and class III was increased in major depression cases.
- NRG3 class I, II and IV were actively involved in the developmental stages,
- The rs10748842 risk genotype predicted elevated class II and III expression, consistent with previous reports in the brain, with tissue-specific analyses suggesting that classes II and III are brain-specific isoforms of NRG3.
