= Trastuzumab =

Medication

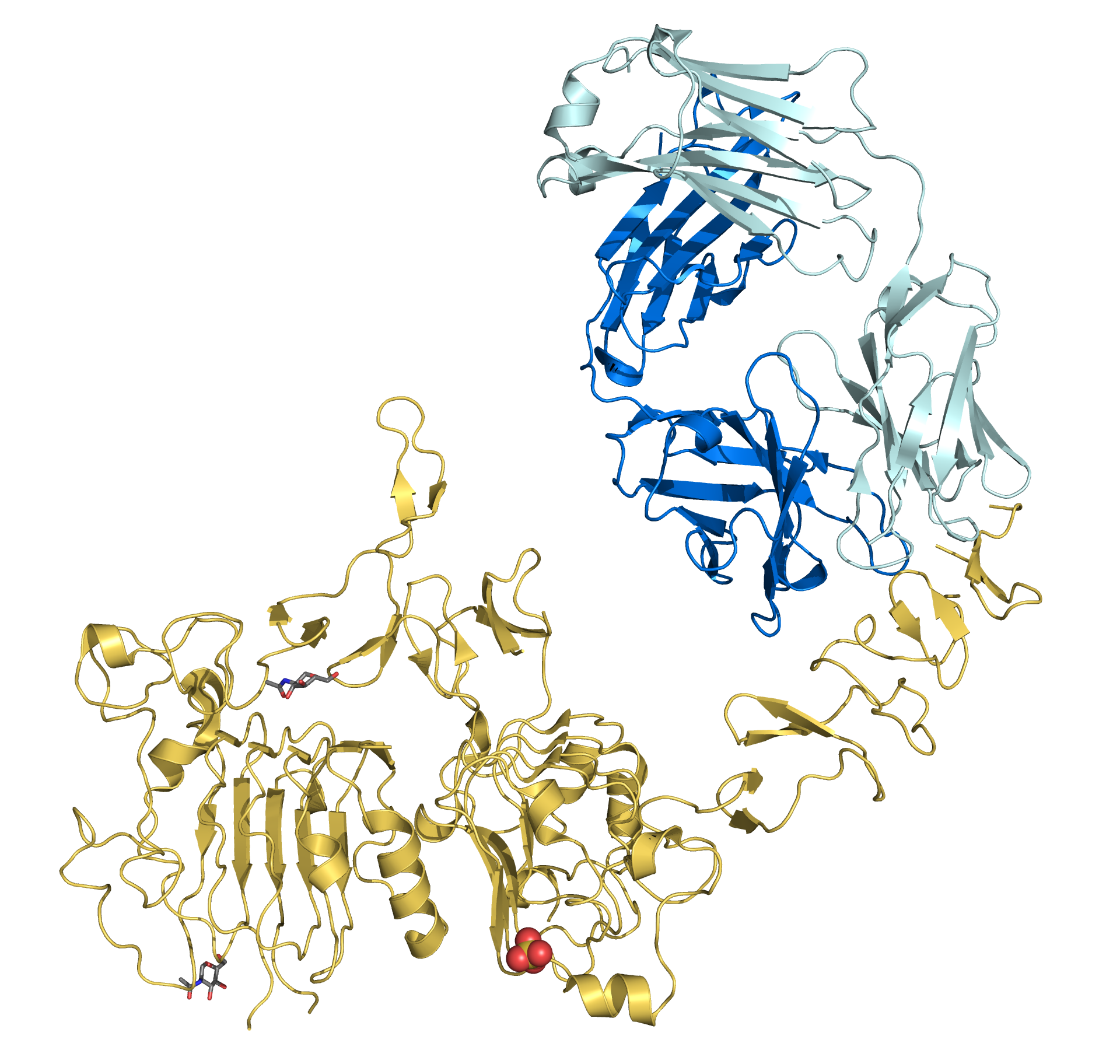
- Trastuzumab Fab region (cyan) binding HER2/neu (gold)

Monoclonal antibody
- Type: Whole antibody
- Source: Humanized (from mouse)
- Target: HER2/neu

Clinical data
- Trade names: Herceptin, Herceptin SC
- Biosimilars: trastuzumab-anns, trastuzumab-dkst, trastuzumab-dttb, trastuzumab-pkrb, trastuzumab-qyyp, trastuzumab-strf, Adheroza, Dazublys, Hercessi, Herzuma, Herwenda, Kanjinti, Ogivri, Ontruzant, Trastucip, Trazimera, Tuznue, Tuzucip, Zercepac
- AHFS/Drugs.com: Monograph
- MedlinePlus: a699019
- License data: US DailyMed: Trastuzumab
- Pregnancy category: AU: D
- Routes of administration: Intravenous, subcutaneous
- Drug class: Antineoplastic agent
- ATC code: L01FD01 (WHO)

Legal status
- Legal status: AU: S4 (Prescription only); CA: ℞-only / Schedule D; US: ℞-only; EU: Rx-only

Pharmacokinetic data
- Metabolism: Unknown, possibly reticuloendothelial system
- Elimination half-life: 2-12 days

Identifiers
- CAS Number: 180288-69-1
- PubChem SID: 46507516
- DrugBank: DB00072
- ChemSpider: none
- UNII: P188ANX8CK
- KEGG: D03257
- ChEMBL: ChEMBL1201585
- ECHA InfoCard: 100.224.377

Chemical and physical data
- Formula: C_{6470}H_{10012}N_{1726}O_{2013}S_{42}
- Molar mass: 145531.86 g·mol^{−1}

Trastuzumab, sold under the brand name Herceptin among others, is a monoclonal antibody used to treat breast cancer and stomach cancer. It is specifically used for cancer that is HER2 receptor positive. It may be used by itself or together with other chemotherapy medication. Trastuzumab is given by slow injection into a vein and injection just under the skin.

Common side effects include fever, infection, cough, headache, trouble sleeping, and rash. Other severe side effects include heart failure, allergic reactions, and lung disease. Use during pregnancy may harm the baby. Trastuzumab works by binding to the HER2 receptor and slowing down cell replication.

Trastuzumab was approved for medical use in the United States in September 1998, and in the European Union in August 2000. It is on the World Health Organization's List of Essential Medicines.

== Medical uses ==
The safety and efficacy of trastuzumab-containing combination therapies (with chemotherapy, hormone blockers, or lapatinib) for the treatment of metastatic breast cancer. The overall hazard ratios (HR) for overall survival and progression free survival were 0.82 and 0.61, respectively. It was difficult to accurately ascertain the true impact of trastuzumab on survival, as in three of the seven trials, over half of the patients in the control arm were allowed to cross-over and receive trastuzumab after their cancer began to progress. Thus, this analysis likely underestimates the true survival benefit associated with trastuzumab treatment in this population.

In early-stage HER2-positive breast cancer, trastuzumab-containing regimens improved overall survival (Hazard ratio (HR) = 0.66) and disease-free survival (HR = 0.60). Increased risk of heart failure (RR = 5.11) and decline in left ventricular ejection fraction (relative risk RR = 1.83) were seen in these trials as well. Two trials involving shorter term treatment with trastuzumab did not differ in efficacy from longer trials, but produced less cardiac toxicity.

The original studies of trastuzumab showed that it improved overall survival in late-stage (metastatic) HER2-positive breast cancer from 20.3 to 25.1 months. In early-stage HER2-positive breast cancer, it reduces the risk of cancer returning after surgery. The absolute reduction in the risk of cancer returning within three years was 9.5%, and the absolute reduction in the risk of death within 3 years was reduced by 3%. However, it increases serious heart problems by an absolute risk of 2.1%, though the problems may resolve if treatment is stopped.

Trastuzumab has had a "major impact in the treatment of HER2-positive metastatic breast cancer." The combination of trastuzumab with chemotherapy has been shown to increase both survival and response rate, in comparison to trastuzumab alone.

It is possible to determine the "erbB2 status" of a tumor, which can be used to predict efficacy of treatment with trastuzumab. If it is determined that a tumor is overexpressing the erbB2 oncogene and the patient has no significant pre-existing heart disease, then a patient is eligible for treatment with trastuzumab. It is surprising that although trastuzumab has great affinity for HER2 and high doses can be administered (because of its low toxicity), 70% of HER2+ patients do not respond to treatment. In fact resistance to the treatment develops rapidly, in virtually all patients. A mechanism of resistance involves failure to downregulate p27^{Kip1} as well as suppressing p27 translocation to the nucleus in breast cancer, enabling cdk2 to induce cell proliferation.

In May 2021, the FDA approved pembrolizumab in combination with trastuzumab, fluoropyrimidine- and platinum-containing chemotherapy for the first-line treatment of people with locally advanced unresectable or metastatic HER2 positive gastric or gastroesophageal junction (GEJ) adenocarcinoma.

=== Duration of treatment ===
The optimal duration of add-on trastuzumab treatment after surgery for early breast cancer is unknown. One year of treatment is generally accepted based on clinical trial evidence that demonstrated the superiority of one-year treatment over none. However, a small Finnish trial also showed similar improvement with nine weeks of treatment over no therapy. Because of the lack of direct head-to-head comparison in clinical trials, it is unknown whether a shorter duration of treatment may be just as effective (with fewer side effects) than the accepted practice of treatment for one year. Debate about treatment duration has become a relevant issue for many public health policy makers because administering trastuzumab for a year is very expensive. Consequently, some countries with a taxpayer-funded public health system, such as New Zealand, chose to fund limited adjuvant therapy. However, subsequently New Zealand has revised its policy and now funds trastuzumab treatment for up to 12 months.

== Adverse effects ==
Some of the common side effects of trastuzumab are flu-like symptoms (such as fever, chills and mild pain), nausea and diarrhea.

One of the more serious complications of trastuzumab is its effect on the heart, although this is rare. In 2–7% of cases, trastuzumab is associated with cardiac dysfunction, which includes congestive heart failure. As a result, regular cardiac screening with either a MUGA scan or echocardiography is commonly undertaken during the trastuzumab treatment period. The decline in ejection fraction appears to be reversible.

Trastuzumab downregulates neuregulin-1 (NRG-1), which is essential for the activation of cell survival pathways in cardiomyocytes and the maintenance of cardiac function. NRG-1 activates the MAPK pathway and the PI3K/AKT pathway as well as focal adhesion kinases (FAK). These are all significant for the function and structure of cardiomyocytes. Trastuzumab can therefore lead to cardiac dysfunction.

Trastuzumab may harm a developing fetus.

== Mechanism of action ==
The HER2 gene (also known as HER2/neu and ErbB2 gene) is amplified in 20–30% of early-stage breast cancers. Trastuzumab is a monoclonal antibody targeting HER2, inducing an immune-mediated response that causes internalization and recycling of HER2. It may also upregulate cell cycle inhibitors such as p21^{Waf1} and p27^{Kip1}.

The HER2 pathway promotes cell growth and division when it is functioning normally; however, when it is overexpressed, cell growth accelerates beyond its normal limits. In some types of cancer, the pathway is exploited to promote rapid cell growth and proliferation and hence tumor formation. The EGF pathway includes the receptors HER1 (EGFR), HER2, HER3, and HER4; the binding of ligands (e.g. EGF etc.) to HER receptors is required to activate the pathway. The pathway initiates the MAP kinase pathway as well as the PI3 kinase/AKT pathway, which in turn activates the NF-κB pathway. In cancer cells the HER2 protein can be expressed up to 100 times more than in normal cells (2 million versus 20,000 per cell).

The HER receptors are proteins that are embedded in the cell membrane and communicate molecular signals from outside the cell (molecules called EGFs) to inside the cell, and turn genes on and off. The HER (human epidermal growth factor receptor) protein, binds to human epidermal growth factor, and stimulates cell proliferation. In some cancers, notably certain types of breast cancer, HER2 is over-expressed and causes cancer cells to reproduce uncontrollably.

HER2 is localized at the cell surface, and carries signals from outside the cell to the inside. Signaling compounds called mitogens (specifically EGF in this case) arrive at the cell membrane, and bind to the extracellular domain of the HER family of receptors. Those bound proteins then link (dimerize), activating the receptor. HER2 sends a signal from its intracellular domain, activating several different biochemical pathways. These include the PI3K/Akt pathway and the MAPK pathway. Signals on these pathways promote cell proliferation and the growth of blood vessels to nourish the tumor (angiogenesis). ERBB2 is the preferred dimerization partner for the other family members and ERBB2 heterodimers signaling is stronger and longer acting compared to heterodimers between other ERBB members. It has been reported that Trastuzumab induces the formation of complementarity-determining regions (CDRs) leading to surface redistribution of ERBB2 and EGFR in CDRs and that the ERBB2-dependent MAPK phosphorylation and EGFR/ERBB1 expression are both required for CDR formation. CDR formation requires activation of both the protein regulator of actin polymerization N-WASP, mediated by ERK1/2, and of the actin-depolymerizing protein cofilin, mediated by EGFR/ERBB1. Furthermore, this latter event may be inhibited by the negative cell motility regulator p140Cap, as we found that p140Cap overexpression led to cofilin deactivation and inhibition of CDR formation.

Normal cell division—mitosis—has checkpoints that keep cell division under control. Some of the proteins that control this cycle are called cdk2 (CDKs). Overexpression of HER2 sidesteps these checkpoints, causing cells to proliferate in an uncontrolled fashion.

Trastuzumab binds to domain IV of the extracellular segment of the HER2/neu receptor. Monoclonal antibodies that bind to this region have been shown to reverse the phenotype of HER2/neu expressing tumor cells. Cells treated with trastuzumab undergo arrest during the G1 phase of the cell cycle so there is reduced proliferation. It has been suggested that trastuzumab does not alter HER-2 expression, but downregulates activation of AKT. In addition, trastuzumab suppresses angiogenesis both by induction of antiangiogenic factors and repression of proangiogenic factors. It is thought that a contribution to the unregulated growth observed in cancer could be due to proteolytic cleavage of HER2/neu that results in the release of the extracellular domain. One of the most relevant proteins that trastuzumab activates is the tumor suppressor p27^{Kip1}, also known as CDKN1B. Trastuzumab has been shown to inhibit HER2/neu ectodomain cleavage in breast cancer cells.

Experiments in laboratory animals indicate that antibodies, including trastuzumab, when bound to a cell, induce immune cells to kill that cell, and that such antibody-dependent cell-mediated cytotoxicity is another important mechanism of action.

== Predicting response ==
Trastuzumab inhibits the effects of overexpression of HER2. If the breast cancer does not overexpress HER2, trastuzumab will have no beneficial effect (and may cause harm). Doctors use laboratory tests to discover whether HER2 is overexpressed. In the routine clinical laboratory, the most commonly employed methods for this are immunohistochemistry (IHC) and either silver, chromogenic or fluorescent in situ hybridisation (SISH/CISH/FISH). HER2 amplification can be detected by virtual karyotyping of formalin-fixed paraffin embedded tumor. Virtual karyotyping has the added advantage of assessing copy number changes throughout the genome, in addition to detecting HER-2 amplification (but not overexpression). Numerous PCR-based methodologies have also been described in the literature. It is also possible to estimate HER2 copy number from microarray data.

There are two FDA-approved commercial kits available for HER2 IHC; Dako HercepTest and Ventana Pathway.

Fluorescent in situ hybridization (FISH) is viewed as being the "gold standard" technique in identifying patients who would benefit from trastuzumab, but it is expensive and requires fluorescence microscopy and an image capture system. The main expense involved with CISH is in the purchase of FDA-approved kits, and as it is not a fluorescent technique it does not require specialist microscopy and slides may be kept permanently. Comparative studies of CISH and FISH have shown that these two techniques show excellent correlation. The lack of a separate chromosome 17 probe on the same section is an issue with regards to acceptance of CISH. As of June 2011 Roche has obtained FDA approval for the INFORM HER2 Dual ISH DNA Probe cocktail developed by Ventana Medical Systems. The DDISH (Dual-chromagen/Dual-hapten In-situ hybridization) cocktail uses both HER2 and Chromosome 17 hybridization probes for chromogenic visualization on the same tissue section. The detection can be achieved by using a combination of ultraView SISH(silver in-situ hybridization) and ultraView Red ISH for deposition of distinct chromgenic precipitates at the site of DNP or DIG labeled probes.

== Resistance ==
One of the challenges in the treatment of breast cancer patients by herceptin is our understanding towards herceptin resistance. In the last decade, several assays have been performed to understand the mechanism of Herceptin resistance with/without supplementary drugs. Recently, all this information has been collected and compiled in form of a database HerceptinR.

== History ==
The drug was first discovered by scientists including Axel Ullrich and H. Michael Shepard at Genentech, Inc. in South San Francisco, CA. Earlier discovery about the neu oncogene by Robert Weinberg's lab and the monoclonal antibody recognizing the oncogenic receptor by Mark Greene's lab also contributed to the establishment of HER2 targeted therapies. Dr. Dennis Slamon subsequently worked on trastuzumab's development. A book about Dr. Slamon's work was made into a television film called Living Proof, that premiered in 2008. Genentech developed trastuzumab jointly with UCLA, beginning the first clinical trial with 15 women in 1992. By 1996, clinical trials had expanded to over 900 women, but due to pressure from advocates based on early success, Genentech worked with the FDA to begin a lottery system allowing 100 women each quarter access to the medication outside the trials. Herceptin was Fast-tracked by the FDA and gained approval in September 1998.

Biocon Ltd and its partner Mylan obtained regulatory approval to sell a biosimilar in 2014, but Roche contested the legality of the approval; that litigation ended in 2016, and Biocon and Mylan each introduced their own branded biosimilars.

== Society and culture ==
=== Economics ===
Trastuzumab costs about US$70,000 for a full course of treatment.

Australia has negotiated a lower price of A$50,000 per course of treatment.

Since October 2006, trastuzumab has been made available for Australian women and men with early-stage breast cancer via the Pharmaceutical Benefits Scheme. This is estimated to cost the country over A$470 million for 4–5 years supply of the drug.

Roche has agreed with Emcure in India to make an affordable version of this cancer drug available to the Indian market.

Roche has changed the brand name of the drug and has re-introduced an affordable version of the same in the Indian market. The new drug named Herclon would cost approximately RS75,000 INR (US$ 870) in the Indian market.

On 16 September 2014, Genentech notified hospitals in the United States that, as of October, trastuzumab could only be purchased through their selected specialty drugs distributors not through the usual general line wholesalers. By being forced to purchase through specialty pharmacies, hospitals lost rebates from the big wholesalers and the ability to negotiate cost-minus discounts with their wholesalers.

=== Biosimilars ===
By 2014, around 20 companies, particularly from emerging markets, were developing biosimilar versions of trastuzumab after Roche/Genentech's patents expired in 2014 in Europe, and in 2019 in the United States.

In January 2015, BIOCAD announced the first trastuzumab biosimilar approved by the Ministry of Health of the Russian Federation. Iran also approved its own version of the monoclonal antibody in January 2016, as AryoTrust, and announced its readiness to export the drug to other countries in the Middle-East and Central Asia when trade sanctions were lifted.

In 2016, the investigational biosimilar MYL-1401O showed comparable efficacy and safety to the Herceptin branded trastuzumab. Trastuzumab-dkst (Ogivri, Mylan GmbH) was approved in the United States in December 2017, to "treat people with breast cancer or gastric or gastroesophageal junction adenocarcinoma whose tumors overexpress the HER-2 gene." Ogivri was authorized for medical use in the European Union in December 2018.

In November 2017, the European Commission authorized Ontruzant, a biosimilar from Samsung Bioepis Co., Ltd, for the treatment of early breast cancer, metastatic breast cancer and metastatic gastric cancer. Ontruzant is the first trastuzumab biosimilar to receive regulatory approval in the European Union.

Herzuma was authorized for medical use in the European Union in February 2018. Herzuma, a trastuzumab biosimilar, was approved in the United States in December 2018. The approval was based on comparisons of extensive structural and functional product characterization, animal data, human pharmacokinetic, clinical immunogenicity, and other clinical data demonstrating that Herzuma is biosimilar to US Herceptin. Herzuma has been approved as a biosimilar, not as an interchangeable product.

Kanjinti was authorized for medical use in the European Union in May 2018.

Trazimera was authorized for medical use in the European Union in July 2018.

Ogivri was approved for medical use in Canada in May 2019.

Trazimera was approved for medical use in Canada in August 2019.

Herzuma was approved for medical use in Canada in September 2019.

Kanjinti was approved for medical use in Canada in February 2020.

Zercepac was authorized for medical use in the European Union in July 2020.

Trastucip and Tuzucip were approved for medical use in Australia in July 2022.

In September 2023, the Committee for Medicinal Products for Human Use (CHMP) of the European Medicines Agency adopted a positive opinion, recommending the granting of a marketing authorization for the medicinal product Herwenda, intended for the treatment of HER2-positive breast and gastric cancer. The applicant for this medicinal product is Sandoz GmbH. Herwenda was authorized for medical use in the European Union in November 2023.

Trastuzumab-strf (Hercessi) was approved for medical use in the United States in April 2024.

In July 2024, the CHMP adopted a positive opinion, recommending the granting of a marketing authorization for the medicinal product Tuznue, intended for the treatment of breast and gastric cancer. The applicant for this medicinal product is Prestige Biopharma Belgium BVBA. Tuznue is a biosimilar medicinal product. Tuznue was authorized for medical use in the European Union in September 2024.

Adheroza was approved for medical use in Canada in August 2024.

In April 2025, the CHMP adopted a positive opinion, recommending the granting of a marketing authorization for the medicinal product Dazublys, intended for the treatment of breast and gastric cancer. The applicant for this medicinal product is CuraTeQ Biologics s.r.o. Dazublys is a biosimilar medicinal product that is highly similar to the reference product Herceptin (trastuzumab), which was authorized in the EU in August 2000. Dazublys was authorized for medical use in the EU in June 2025.

=== Related conjugates ===
Trastuzumab is also a component of some antibody-drug conjugates, such as trastuzumab emtansine, and trastuzumab deruxtecan.
