= Gerald Fischbach =

American physician and neuroscientist (1938–2026)

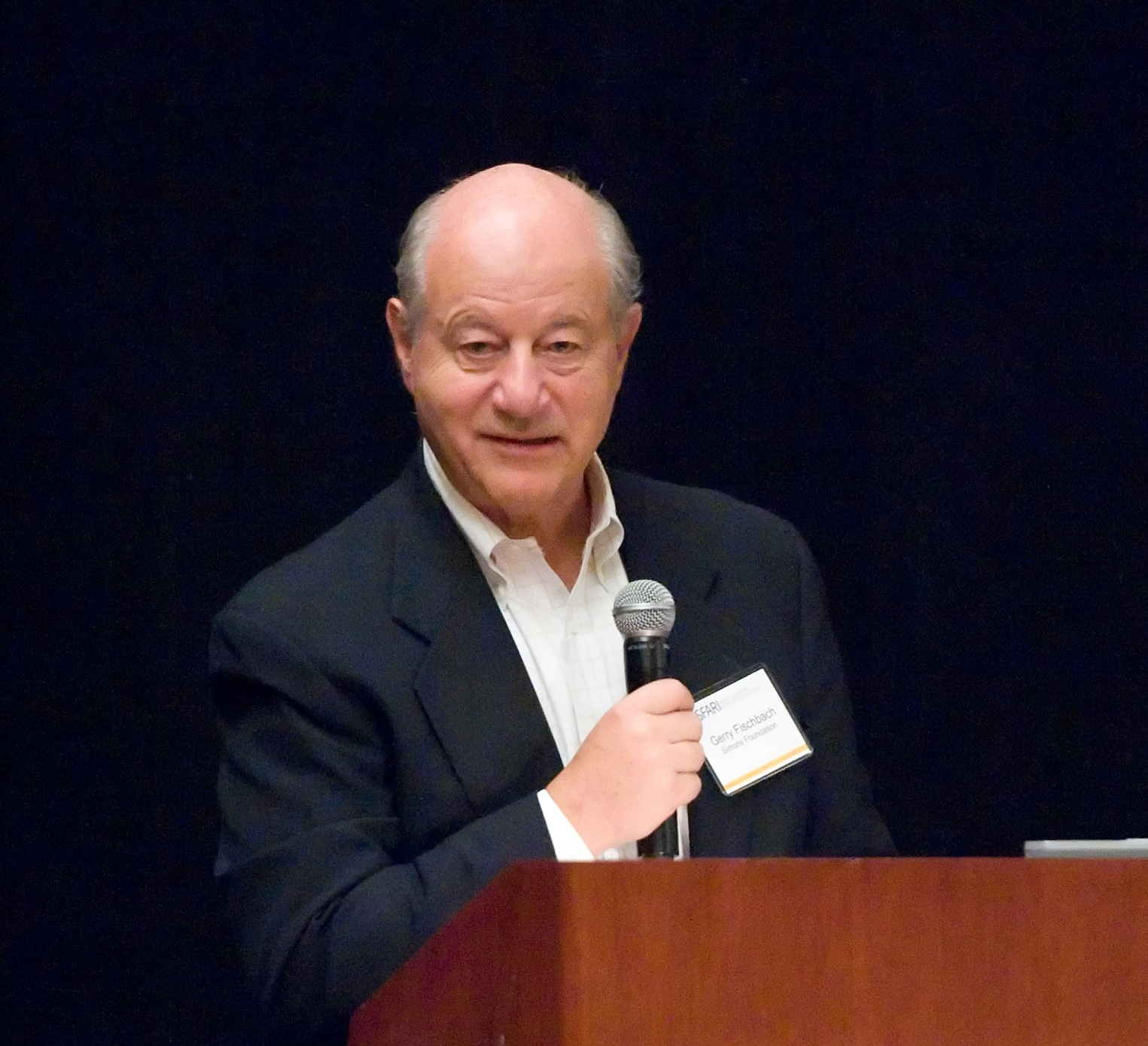
- Gerald Fischbach at the Simons Foundation Autism Research Initiative Conference
- Born: Gerald David Fischbach; November 15, 1938; New Rochelle, New York, U.S.
- Died: October 25, 2026 (aged 87); Westchester, New York, U.S.
- Education: Colgate University; Cornell University
- Occupation: Neuroscientist
- Employer(s): Harvard University; Washington University in St. Louis; Columbia University

Gerald David Fischbach (November 15, 1938 – October 25, 2026) was an American neuroscientist. He received his M.D. from the Weill Cornell Medicine in 1965 before beginning his research career at the National Institutes of Health in 1966, where his research focused on the mechanisms of neuromuscular junctions. After his tenure at the National Institutes of Health, Fischbach was a professor at Harvard Medical School from 1972 to 1981 and from 1990 to 1998 and the Washington University School of Medicine from 1981 to 1990. In 1998, he was named the director of the National Institute of Neurological Disorders and Stroke before becoming the Vice President and Dean of the Health and Biomedical Sciences, the Dean of the Faculty of Medicine, and the Dean of the Faculty of Health Sciences at Columbia University from 2001 to 2006. Fischbach later served as the scientific director overseeing the Simons Foundation Autism Research Initiative. Throughout Fischbach's career, much of his research has focused on the formation and function of the neuromuscular junction, which stemmed from his innovative use of cell culture to study synaptic mechanisms.

== Education and experience ==
Fischbach attended Colgate University in Hamilton, New York, where he was a four-year recipient of the New York State Regents Scholarship. He graduated magna cum laude with high honors in mathematics receiving a Bachelor of Arts degree in Mathematics and Chemistry. Fischbach was also elected a member of Colgate University's Phi Beta Kappa chapter in 1960. After graduating from Colgate University, Fischbach attended Weill Cornell Medical College of Cornell University, where he was a recipient of the New York State Medical Scholarship from 1962 to 1965 and the Polk Award for Undergraduate Research in 1965, before graduating with his M.D. that same year. Additionally, Fischbach received an honorary master's degree from Harvard University in 1978 and an honorary Doctor of Science degree from Colgate University in 2003. After graduating medical school, Fischbach interned at the University of Washington hospital in Seattle, Washington before beginning his research career at the National Institutes of Health in 1966.

== Research career ==
=== National Institutes of Health 1966–1973 ===
Fischbach began his research career at the National Institutes of Health, where he served as a senior surgeon at the National Institute of Neurological Disorders and Stroke (NINDS) before becoming a fellow at the National Institute of Child Health from 1966 to 1973. Much of Fischbach's research concentrated on the mechanisms controlling action potentials and synapses, from which he pioneered the use of neuron and muscle cell culture to study neuromuscular junctions. Fischbach used this technique to reconstruct neuromuscular junctions from dissociated spinal cord and muscle cells from chick embryos to show that functional synaptic connections reformed and were capable of sending spontaneous or induced action potentials. However, cultures containing isolated spinal cord cells were unable to send similar action potentials. This technique proved to be an important model for further studies to determine the essential mechanisms controlling neuromuscular junction development and maintenance. Towards the end of his tenure at the National Institutes of Health, Fischbach began to search for motor neuron molecules responsible for regulating the number of acetylcholine receptors on postsynaptic cells. This research project culminated in 1993 with the isolation of the ARIA (acetylcholine receptor inducing activity) protein, which is a member of the neuregulin family and is responsible for stimulating the production of acetylcholine receptors in postsynaptic muscle tissue.

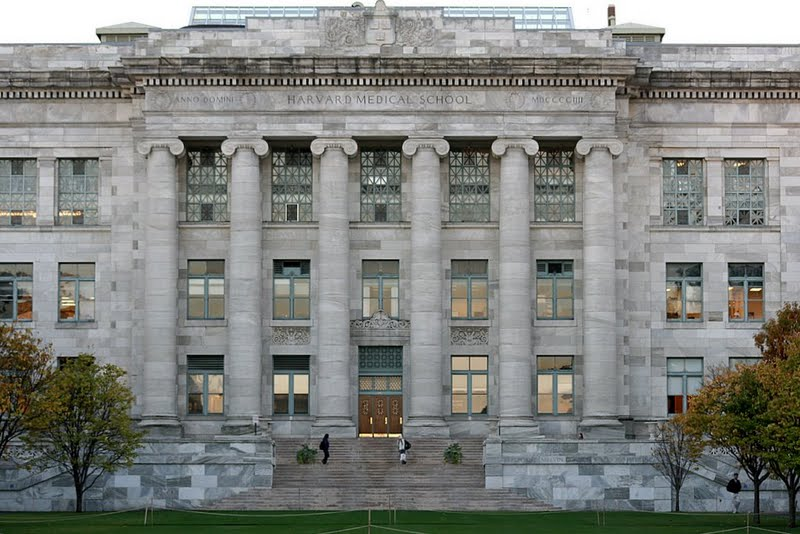
Harvard Medical School Boston, MA

=== Harvard University 1973–1981, 1990–1998 ===
After his time at the National Institutes of Health, Fischbach obtained a position as an associate professor at Harvard Medical School's Department of Pharmacology in 1973. By 1978 he obtained tenure and became a full professor, and continued teaching at Harvard University for the next three years. After a nine-year stint at Washington University School of Medicine in St. Louis, Missouri, he returned to Harvard to serve as the Nathan Marsh Pusey Professor of Neurobiology and Chairman of the Neurobiology Departments of both Harvard Medical School and Massachusetts General Hospital from 1990 to 1998. During his years as an associate professor, he researched the development of precursor muscle cells, specifically the development of acetylcholine receptors on embryonic chick pectoral muscles. Later on he continued his research on ARIA that he started at the National Institutes of Health, specifically focusing on the expression of the protein's isoforms and their effects on tyrosine kinases. In 1993, Fischbach was involved with the founding of the Mind, Brain, Behavior Institute. This inter-disciplinary program aims to research the different structures, evolution, and development of the nervous system in order to better understand human behavior.

=== Washington University School of Medicine 1981–1990 ===
Fischbach spent nine years at the Washington University School of Medicine, where he served as the Edison Professor of Neurobiology and Head of the Department of Anatomy and Neurobiology. During his time here, Fischbach continued his work on the ARIA protein. When ARIA isolated from chick embryo brain was applied to chicken myotubes, which are developing chicken muscle fibers, it was shown to increase the rate of insertion of acetylcholine receptors into chicken myotube membranes. This indicated ARIA could play a role in acetylcholine receptor insertion in neuromuscular junctions. Additionally, it was demonstrated that ARIA stimulated the transcription of α acetylcholine receptor subunits leading to an increase in α subunit messenger RNA (mRNA) and precursors, but had no effect on the mRNA levels of the γ or δ acetylcholine receptor subunits. This indicated that the amount α acetylcholine receptor subunit limits the synthesis and subsequent insertion of acetylcholine receptors into chicken myotube membranes.

In addition to his ARIA work, Fischbach also researched rapid desensitization of glutamate receptors in chicken spinal cord and rat hippocampal neurons. Using focal ionophoresis and pressure injections to apply glutamate and other agonists including NMDA, AMPA, and kainate to different regions of the neurons, he noticed that certain hot spots were desensitized more rapidly that other sites on the neuron. Fischbach and his collaborators hypothesized that these hot spots may be located at synapses between neurons, where clusters of glutamate receptors were present.

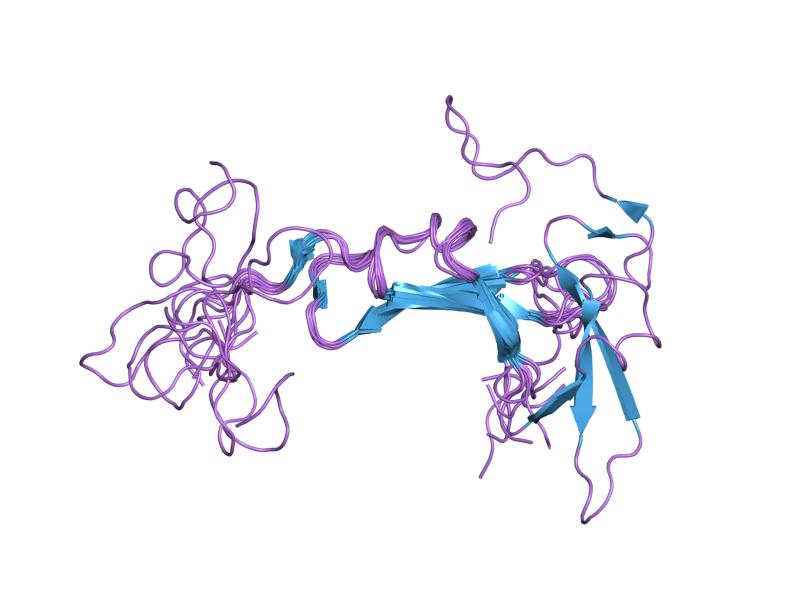
Epidermal growth factor domain of heregulin alpha, a member of the neuregulin family.

=== National Institute of Neurological Disorders and Stroke 1998–2001 ===
Fischbach returned to the NIH in 1998 when he was named director of the National Institute of Neurological Disorders and Stroke (NINDS), a division of the NIH that supports research on the brain and nervous system. While he was director, Fischbach oversaw a staff of more than 700 and an annual budget of about $800 million. This money was used to support research by private and public organizations across the country as well as scientists working in labs at NINDS. Fischbach accomplished many things while director of NINDS, one of which being helping to shape national policy on important neurological research issues. He received great praise for his time as director from both Harold Varmus, former director of the NIH and current director of the National Cancer Institute (NCI), and Richard Klausner, former director of the NCI. Fischbach left NINDS is 2001 when he was named Columbia University's Vice President for Health and Biomedical Sciences.

While at the NINDS, Fischbach researched the effects of neuregulin, which is a family of proteins including heregulin, neu differentiation factor, ARIA, and glial growth factor that are critical for vertebrate embryogenesis and specifically for the formation of vertebrate spinal cord oligodendrocytes. Fischbach and his colleagues noticed that oligodendrocytes failed to form in mice that were homozygous for the mutant neuregulin gene. However, when wild-type neuregulin was added to homozygous mutant neuregulin explants (isolated tissue cell cultures) nine days after conception of the embryos, normal oligodendrocyte development occurred. This indicated that neuregulin is not necessary for the proliferation of oligodendrocyte multipotent precursor cells. Additionally, when IgB4, a neuregulin inhibitor, is added to wild-type explants, oligodendrocyte development failed to occur.

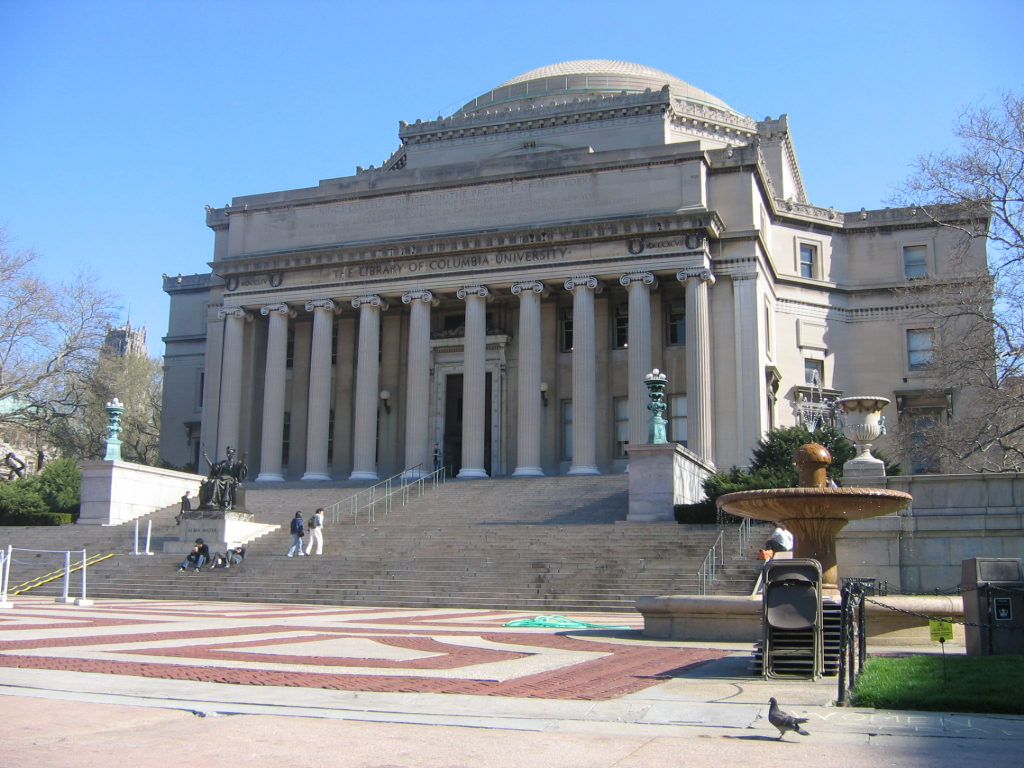
Columbia University Low Memorial Library New York City, NY

=== Columbia University 2001–2006 ===
After serving as the Director of the National Institute of Neurological Disorders and Stroke at the National Institute of Health, Gerald Fischbach was selected as the Vice President and Dean of the Health and Biomedical Sciences, the Dean of the Faculty of Medicine, and the Dean of the Faculty of Health Sciences at Columbia University. He served as the Dean for all three branches simultaneously. Fischbach was interviewed in 2001 by the newspaper for Columbia University Health Sciences, and there he stated that the mission of the University was "to use all its resources to reduce the burden of human disease." He explained that this required interdisciplinary and collaborative work with the other departments and resources at Columbia University. The Health and Biomedical Sciences division at Columbia University includes the School of Nursing, the Joseph L. Mailman School of Public Health, the School of Dental Medicine, the College of Physicians and Surgeons, and the Audubon Business and Technology Center. The Audubon Center is the only research park that is affiliated with a university in New York City and holds the only incubator for business related to biotechnology.

The research Fischbach conducted at Columbia University stemmed from his previous work at Harvard University, Washington University and with the National Institute of Neurological Disorders and Stroke, National Institute of Health. The specialized focus of his research was on the influence trophic factors could have on the survival of nerve cells and the efficiency of synapses. After his arrival to Columbia, Fischbach was focused on the expression of neuregulin in regards to neuromuscular synapses, signaling pathways in the brain, transcription factors, as well as work on autism. His research on Neuregulin-1 revealed a possible function in CNS neurogenesis since the neuregulins were labeled throughout proliferation with an anti-MAP2 antibody and an anti-nestin antibody were suggested to have become neuron-restricted progenitors. Some of his other research examined the relationship between neuregulin and expression of myosin heavy chain and transcription factors in human muscle. The research found that treatment including neuregulin increased the number of acetylcholine receptors on the surface of the myotube as well as an increase in the early growth response family for transcription factors. These findings impact the available knowledge regarding muscle spindle fiber formation, myosin heavy chains development, and the feasibility of mimicking muscle development processes in vitro.

== Later research ==
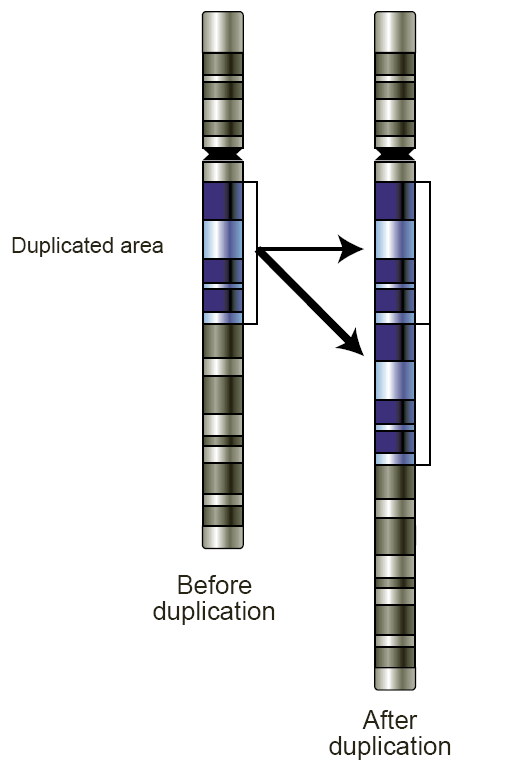
Gene duplication can cause copy number variants, which result in chromosomes with multiple copies of genes.

=== Simons Foundation 2006–2026 ===
In 2006, Fischbach joined the Simons Foundation as the scientific director to oversee the Simons Foundation Autism Research Initiative. The Simons Foundation is an organization founded by Jim Simons and his wife Marilyn, and has awarded $130 million for autism research as of 2008. As scientific director, Fischbach collaborates with mathematicians, engineers, chemists, and neuroscientists to try and understand autism more completely. Currently, Fischbach oversees research focusing on the neurobiology of autism and how it can relate to finding a possible cure.

Additionally, Fischbach and his colleagues worked on the Simons Simplex Collection (SSC), which is designed to identify genetic factors that increase the risk of autism. Over 100 researchers and 13 universities have interviewed and collected blood samples from more than 2000 families to look for a genetic linkage to autism. The majority of tested individuals have moderate to severe autistic symptoms and do not display high levels of intellectual disability. Additionally, autistic individuals from enrolled SSC families exhibit genetic deletions, duplications, and copy number variants (CNVs) that are not present in unaffected family members. Siblings serve as ideal control groups to identify unique CNVs associated with autism. Although CNVs are rare and are found in only up to 1% autistic individuals, the presence of multiple CNVs in autistic individuals may account for a larger fraction of autism cases. Ultimately, the goal of the SSC is to expand the number of individuals enrolled in the program in hope of identifying penetrant CNVs, small de novo mutations, and single nucleotide polymorphisms that are linked to a higher risk of autism.

Along with this research, Fischbach and his colleagues at the Simons Foundation studied diseases that have autistic features, such as Rett syndrome and Fragile X syndrome. The hope is that a better understanding of the central role of the synapse in autistic symptoms can be discovered as well as which specific regions of the brain are responsible for these behaviors. Within the next decade, the ultimate goal of this research is to determine the precise neural circuitry involved in autism and how it translates to the autistic behaviors displayed.

== Personal life and death ==
Fischbach was married to Ruth L. Fischbach, a professor of bioethics in psychiatry at NewYork-Presbyterian Hospital. They had four children.

Fischbach died in Westchester, New York, on October 25, 2026, at the age of 87.

== Honors and publications ==
=== Awards and honors ===
Fischbach has received the following awards:

- 1960 Phi Beta Kappa (Colgate University)
- 1965 Polk Award for Undergraduate Research (Cornell University)
- 1975 Mathilde Solowey Award in Neuroscience (Foundation for Advanced Education in the Sciences: National Institute of Health)
- 1981 W. Alden Spencer Award (College of Physicians and Surgeons, Columbia University)
- 1984 Elected to the National Academy of Sciences
- 1988 Elected to the American Academy of Arts and Sciences
- 1988–1990 McKnight Endowment Fund for Neuroscience Senior Investigator Award
- 1990 Elected to the Institute of Medicine
- 1991 Elected to the European Academy of Sciences and Arts
- 1998 Foundation Ipsen Neuronal Plasticity Prize
- 2000 Dr. Nathan Davis Award
- 2003 Parkinson's Disease Foundation Honor for Contributions
- 2003 Appointed to the Council for Foreign Relations
- 2003 Elected to the American Philosophical Society
- 2004 Maroon Citation (Colgate University)

=== Selected publications ===
Fischbach authored or co-authored over 100 papers on his research work, which according to the Web of Science have been cited over 10,000 times, giving him an h-index of 57. Some selected publications are:

- Falls, Douglad; Rosen, Kenneth; Corfas, Gabriel; Lane, William; Fischbach, Gerald (1993). "ARIA, a protein that stimulates acetylcholine receptor synthesis, is a member of the neu ligand family". Cell. 72 (5): 801–813. doi:10.1016/0092-8674(93)90407-H. PMID 8453670. S2CID 7080652.
- Loeb, Jeffery; Hmadcha, Abdelkrim; Fischbach, Gerald; Land, Susan; Zakarian, Vaagn (2002). "Neuregulin Expression at Neuromuscular Synapses is Modulated by Synaptic Activity and Neurotrophic Factors". The Journal of Neuroscience. 22 (6): 2206–2214. doi:10.1523/JNEUROSCI.22-06-02206.2002. PMC 6758272. PMID 11896160.
- Mann MA, Knipe DM, Fischbach GD, Fields BN (2002). "Type 3 reovirus neuroinvation after intramuscular inoculation: direct invasion of nerve terminals and age-dependent pathogenesis". Virology. 303 (2): 222–31.
- Jacobson C, Duggan D, and Fischbach G, (2004). "Neuregulin induces the expression of transcription factors and myosin heavy chains typical of muscle spindles in cultured human muscle". Proceedings of the National Academy of Sciences of the United States of America. 101 (33): 12218–12223.
- Fischbach, Gerald; Fischbach, Ruth (2004). "Stem cells: science, policy, and ethics". Journal of Clinical Investigation. 114 (10): 1364–1370. doi:10.1172/JCI23549. PMC 525749. PMID 15545983.
- Liu Y, Ford B, Mann M, Fischbach G, (2005). "Neuregulin-1 increases the proliferation of neuronal progenitors from embryonic neural stem cells". Developmental Biology. 283 (2): 437–445.
- Fischbach G, and Lord, C, (2010). "The Simons Simplex Collection: A Resource for Identification of Autism Genetic Risk Factors". Neuron. 68 (2): 192–195.
