= Neuregulin =

Family of four EGF proteins

Neuregulin family
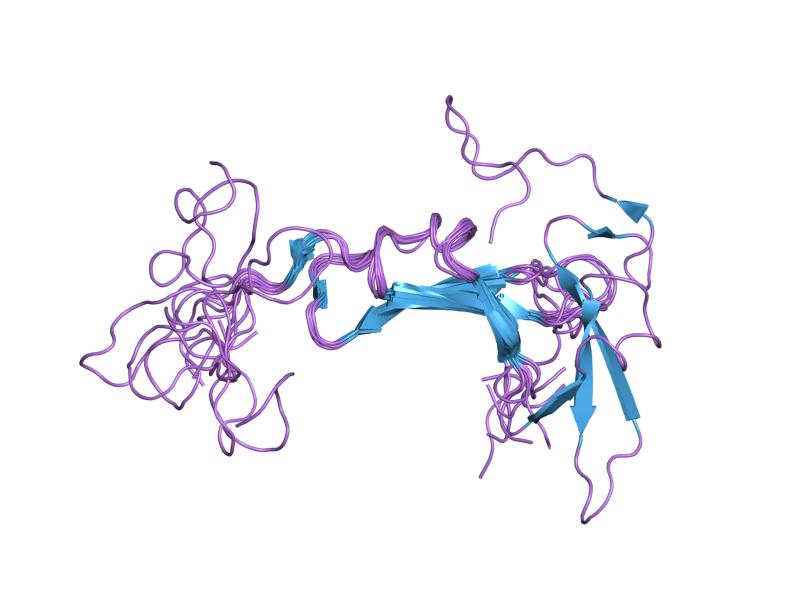
- Structure of the epidermal growth factor-like domain of heregulin-alpha, a ligand for p180erbB-4.

Identifiers
- Symbol: Neuregulin
- Pfam: PF02158
- InterPro: IPR002154
- SCOP2: 1hrf / SCOPe / SUPFAM
Available protein structures:
- PDB: 1hae, 1haf, 1hre, 1hrf IPR002154 PF02158 (ECOD; PDBsum)
- AlphaFold: IPR002154; PF02158

Neuregulins are a family of four structurally related proteins that are part of the EGF family of proteins. These proteins have been shown to have diverse functions in the development of the nervous system and play multiple essential roles in vertebrate embryogenesis including: cardiac development, Schwann cell and oligodendrocyte differentiation, some aspects of neuronal development, as well as the formation of neuromuscular synapses.

Included in the family are heregulin; neu differentiation factor; acetylcholine receptor synthesis stimulator; glial growth factor; and sensory and motor-neuron derived factor. Multiple family members are generated by alternate splicing or by use of several cell type-specific transcription initiation sites. In general, they bind to and activate the erbB family of receptor tyrosine kinases (erbB2 (HER2), erbB3 (HER3), and erbB4 (HER4)), functioning both as heterodimers and homodimers.

== Neuregulin family members ==
The neuregulin family includes:

- Neuregulin 1 (NRG1), with numerous discovered isoforms stemming from alternative splicing:
  - Type I NRG1; alternative names: Heregulin, NEU differentiation factor (NDF), or acetylcholine receptor inducing activity (ARIA)
  - Type II NRG1; alternative name: Glial Growth Factor-2 (GGF2);
  - Type III NRG1; alternative name: Sensory and motor neuron-derived factor (SMDF);
  - Type IV NRG1;
  - Type V NRG1;
  - Type VI NRG1; Types IV-VI are proteins with 3 novel N-terminal domains identified in 2004.
- Neuregulin 2 (NRG2);
- Neuregulin 3 (NRG3);
- Neuregulin 4 (NRG4);

In mammals, neuregulin family members are the products of 4 genes NRG1, NRG2, NRG3 and NRG4 respectively.

The transmembrane forms of neuregulin 1 (NRG1) are present within synaptic vesicles, including those containing glutamate. After exocytosis, NRG1 is in the presynaptic membrane, where the ectodomain of NRG1 may be cleaved off. The ectodomain then migrates across the synaptic cleft and binds to and activates a member of the EGF-receptor family on the postsynaptic membrane. This has been shown to increase the expression of certain glutamate-receptor subunits. NRG1 appears to signal for glutamate-receptor subunit expression, localization, and /or phosphorylation facilitating subsequent glutamate transmission.

The NRG1 gene has been identified as a potential gene determining susceptibility to schizophrenia by a combination of genetic linkage and association approaches.

== NRG1 ==
NRG1 plays a role in synapse development, influencing the upregulation of acetylcholine receptor genes beneath the endplate after mammalian motor neurons have made synaptic contact with muscle fibres, hence its alternative name ARIA = Acetylcholine Receptor Inducing Activity.

== Animal models ==
A study done on mice in early 2009 has indicated that when neuregulin-1\ErbB signalling is disrupted, the dendritic spines of neurons grow but do not fully form. This produced no immediate noticeable changes to brain development, but in adults there was a reduction of dendritic spines on neurons. Glutamatergic signalling was markedly disrupted in the mice as a result of the experiment.

== In fish, birds, and earthworms ==
NRG-1,2,3 have been found in fish and birds.

mRNA similar to mammalian Pro-NRG2 precursor has been found in humus earthworm Lumbricidae.
