= Neuregulin 2 =

Protein-coding gene in the species Homo sapiens

NRG2

Identifiers
- Aliases: NRG2, DON1, HRG2, NTAK, neuregulin 2
- External IDs: OMIM: 603818; MGI: 1098246; GeneCards: NRG2

Gene location (Human)
Chr.	Chromosome 5 (human)
Band	5q31.2	Start	139,846,779 bp
Band	5q31.2	End	140,043,299 bp

Gene location (Mouse)
Chr.	Chromosome 18 (mouse)
Band	18 B2|18 19.38 cM	Start	36,150,705 bp
Band	18 B2|18 19.38 cM	End	36,330,433 bp
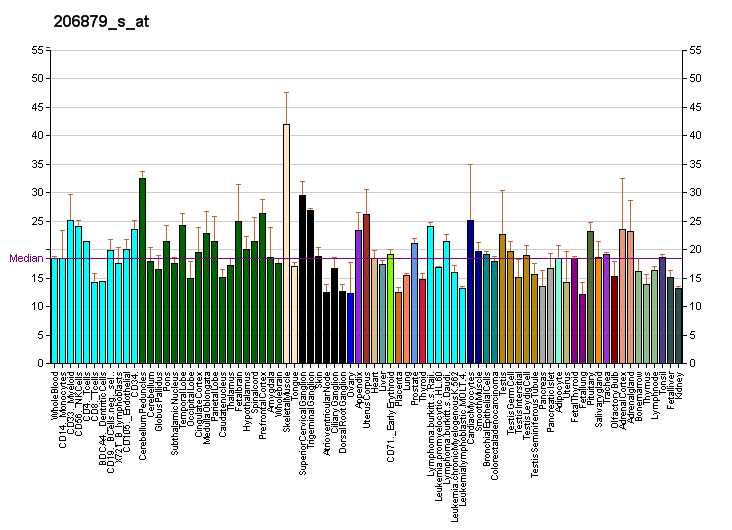

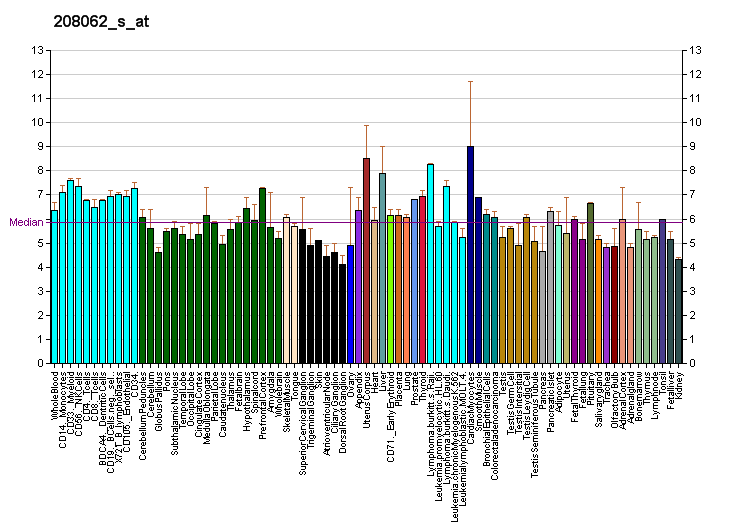
RNA expression pattern
Bgee	Human / Mouse (ortholog); Top expressed in: buccal mucosa cell; paraflocculus of cerebellum; frontal pole; middle frontal gyrus; Brodmann area 10; cerebellar vermis; right hemisphere of cerebellum; testicle; gastrocnemius muscle; left ovary / Top expressed in: cerebellar cortex; neural layer of retina; superior frontal gyrus; dentate gyrus of hippocampal formation granule cell; granulocyte; primary visual cortex; lip; endocardium of ventricle; surface ectoderm; morula; More reference expression data
BioGPS	More reference expression data
Gene ontology
Molecular function	growth factor activity; signaling receptor binding; protein tyrosine kinase activity; phosphatidylinositol-4,5-bisphosphate 3-kinase activity
Cellular component	integral component of membrane; membrane; plasma membrane; extracellular region; intracellular anatomical structure; extracellular space
Biological process	MAPK cascade; signal transduction; regulation of cell motility; phosphatidylinositol phosphate biosynthetic process; peptidyl-tyrosine phosphorylation; ERBB2 signaling pathway; intracellular signal transduction; animal organ development; regulation of signaling receptor activity; positive regulation of protein kinase B signaling; nervous system development
Sources:Amigo / QuickGO
Orthologs
Databases	NCBI: entry; OMA: entry
Species	Human	Mouse
Entrez	9542	100042150
Ensembl	ENSG00000158458	ENSMUSG00000060275
UniProt	O14511	P56974
RefSeq (mRNA)	NM_001184935; NM_004883; NM_013981; NM_013982; NM_013983 NM_013984; NM_013985	NM_001167891; NM_001382420
RefSeq (protein)	NP_001171864; NP_004874; NP_053584; NP_053585; NP_053586	n/a
Location (UCSC)	Chr 5: 139.85 – 140.04 Mb	Chr 18: 36.15 – 36.33 Mb
PubMed search
- Wikidata
View/Edit Human	View/Edit Mouse

Neuregulin 2, also known as NRG2, is a protein which in humans is encoded by the NRG2 gene.

== Function ==
Neuregulin 2 (NRG2) is a novel member of the neuregulin family of growth and differentiation factors. Through interaction with the ErbB family of receptors, NRG2 induces the growth and differentiation of epithelial, neuronal, glial, and other types of cells. The gene consists of 12 exons and the genomic structure is similar to that of neuregulin 1 (NRG1), another member of the neuregulin family of ligands. NRG1 and NRG2 mediate distinct biological processes by acting at different sites in tissues and eliciting different biological responses in cells. The gene is located close to the region for demyelinating Charcot-Marie-Tooth disease locus, but is not responsible for this disease. Alternative transcripts encoding distinct isoforms have been described.
