= Neuregulin 4 =

Protein-coding gene in the species Homo sapiens

NRG4

Identifiers
- Aliases: NRG4, HRG4, neuregulin 4
- External IDs: OMIM: 610894; MGI: 1933833; GeneCards: NRG4

Gene location (Human)
Chr.	Chromosome 15 (human)
Band	15q24.2	Start	75,935,969 bp
Band	15q24.2	End	76,059,795 bp

Gene location (Mouse)
Chr.	Chromosome 9 (mouse)
Band	9|9 B	Start	55,127,506 bp
Band	9|9 B	End	55,234,128 bp
RNA expression pattern
Bgee	Human / Mouse (ortholog); Top expressed in: body of pancreas; right uterine tube; cerebellar hemisphere; right hemisphere of cerebellum; secondary oocyte; left testis; olfactory zone of nasal mucosa; right testis; testicle; muscle of thigh / Top expressed in: zygote; brown adipose tissue; secondary oocyte; Glandular part of endometrium; white adipose tissue; tunica adventitia of aorta; subcutaneous adipose tissue; intercostal muscle; mammary gland; primary oocyte; More reference expression data
BioGPS	n/a
Gene ontology
Molecular function	protein binding; growth factor activity; protein tyrosine kinase activity; phosphatidylinositol-4,5-bisphosphate 3-kinase activity; signaling receptor binding
Cellular component	integral component of membrane; membrane; plasma membrane; extracellular region; intracellular anatomical structure; extracellular space
Biological process	MAPK cascade; ERBB2 signaling pathway; phosphatidylinositol phosphate biosynthetic process; peptidyl-tyrosine phosphorylation; regulation of cell motility; intracellular signal transduction; animal organ development; regulation of signaling receptor activity; positive regulation of protein kinase B signaling; nervous system development
Sources:Amigo / QuickGO
Orthologs
Databases	NCBI: entry; OMA: entry
Species	Human	Mouse
Entrez	145957	83961
Ensembl	ENSG00000169752	ENSMUSG00000032311
UniProt	Q8WWG1	Q9WTX4
RefSeq (mRNA)	NM_138573	NM_032002
RefSeq (protein)	NP_612640	NP_114391
Location (UCSC)	Chr 15: 75.94 – 76.06 Mb	Chr 9: 55.13 – 55.23 Mb
PubMed search
- Wikidata
View/Edit Human	View/Edit Mouse

Neuregulin 4 also known as NRG4 is a member of the neuregulin protein family which in humans is encoded by the NRG4 gene.

== Function ==
The neuregulins, including NRG4, activate erb-b2 receptor tyrosine kinase 4 (ERBB4) to initiating cell signaling through cytosolic tyrosine phosphorylation.

== Clinical significance ==
Loss of expression of NRG4 is frequently seen in advanced bladder cancer while increased NRG4 expression correlates to better survival.
