= ErbB =

Family of proteins

EGF receptor family

Identifiers
- Symbol: ErbB
- InterPro: IPR016245
- Membranome: 1203
Available protein structures:
- PDB: IPR016245
- AlphaFold: IPR016245

The ErbB family of proteins contains four receptor tyrosine kinases, structurally related to the epidermal growth factor receptor (EGFR), its first discovered member. In humans, the family includes Her1 (EGFR, ErbB1), Her2 (ErbB2), Her3 (ErbB3), and Her4 (ErbB4). The gene symbol, ErbB, is derived from the name of a viral oncogene to which these receptors are homologous: erythroblastic leukemia viral oncogene. Insufficient ErbB signaling in humans is associated with the development of neurodegenerative diseases, such as multiple sclerosis and Alzheimer's disease, while excessive ErbB signaling is associated with the development of a wide variety of types of solid tumor.

ErbB protein family signaling is important for development. For example, ErbB-2 and ErbB-4 knockout mice die mid-gestation due to deficient cardiac function associated with a lack of myocardial ventricular trabeculation and display abnormal development of the peripheral nervous system. In ErbB-3 receptor mutant mice, they have less severe defects in the heart and thus are able to survive longer throughout embryogenesis. Lack of Schwann cell maturation leads to degeneration of motor and sensory neurons. Excessive ErbB signaling is associated with the development of a wide variety of types of solid tumor. ErbB-1 and ErbB-2 are found in many human cancers, and their excessive signaling may be critical factors in the development and malignancy of these tumors.

== Family members ==
The ErbB protein family consists of 4 members

- ErbB-1, also named epidermal growth factor receptor (EGFR)
- ErbB-2, also named HER2 in humans and neu in rodents
- ErbB-3, also named HER3
- ErbB-4, also named HER4

v-ErbBs are homologous to EGFR, but lack sequences within the ligand binding ectodomain.

== Structure ==
All four ErbB receptor family members are nearly same in the structure having single-chain of modular glycoproteins. This structure is made up of an extracellular region or ectodomain or ligand binding region that contains approximately 620 amino acids, a single transmembrane-spanning region containing approximately 23 residues, and an intracellular cytoplasmic tyrosine kinase domain containing up to approximately 540 residues. The extracellular region of each family member is made up of 4 subdomains, L1, CR1, L2, and CR2, where "L" signifies a leucine-rich repeat domain and "CR" a cysteine-rich region, and these CR domains contain disulfide modules in their structure as 8 disulfide modules in CR1 domain, whereas 7 modules in CR2 domain. These subdomains are shown in blue (L1), green (CR1), yellow (L2), and red (CR2) in the figure below. These subdomains are also referred to as domains I-IV, respectively. The intracellular/cytoplasmic region of the ErbB receptor consists mainly of three subdomains: A juxtamembrane with approximately 40 residues, a kinase domain containing approximately 260 residues and a C-terminal domain of 220-350 amino acid residues that become activated via phosphorylation of its tyrosine residues that mediates interactions of other ErbB proteins and downstream signaling molecules.

The figure below shows the tridimensional structure of the ErbB family proteins, using the pdb files 1NQL (ErbB-1), 1S78 (ErbB-2), 1M6B (ErbB-3) and 2AHX (ErbB-4):

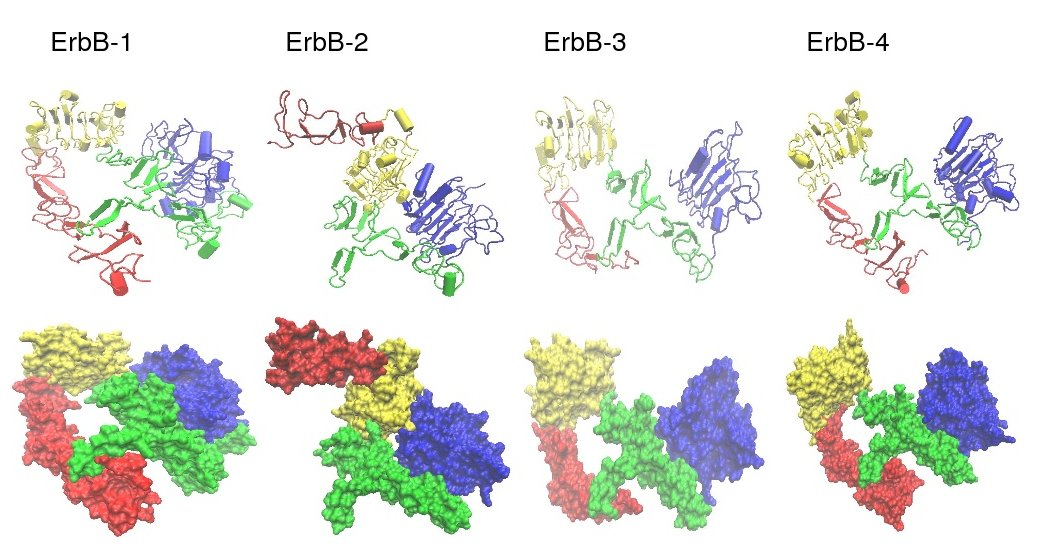
Comparison of ErbB extracellular domain structures

== ErbB and Kinase activation ==
The four members of the ErbB protein family are capable of forming homodimers, heterodimers, and possibly higher-order oligomers upon activation by a subset of potential growth factor ligands. There are 11 growth factors that activate ErbB receptors.

The ability ('+') or inability ('-') of each growth factor to activate each of the ErbB receptors is shown in the table below:

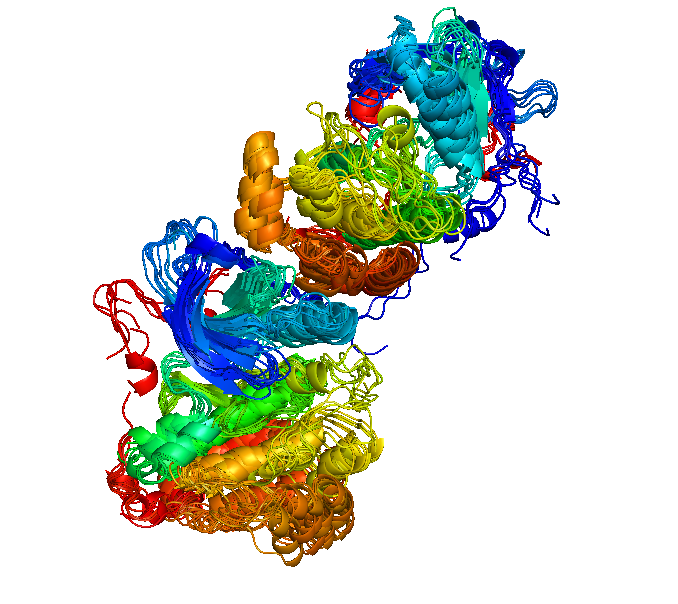
A superposition of similar interfaces observed in crystal structures of the ERBB kinases, including EGFR, ERBB2 (HER2) and ERBB4 (HER4). The protein chains are colored from blue to red from N to C terminus. The kinase at the top of each dimer (as shown) activates the kinase at the bottom of each dimer (Zhang et al., Cell v. 125, pp. 1137–1149, 2008). The cluster was identified with the ProtCID database. The image was made with PyMOL.

Ligand	Receptor			
	ErbB-1	ErbB-2	ErbB-3	ErbB-4
EGF	+	-	-	-
TGF-α	+	-	-	-
HB-EGF	+	-	-	+
amphiregulin	+	-	-	-
betacellulin	+	-	-	+
epigen	+	-	-	-
epiregulin	+	-	-	+
neuregulin 1	-	-	+	+
neuregulin 2	-	-	+	+
neuregulin 3	-	-	-	+
neuregulin 4	-	-	-	+

The dimerization occurs after ligand bind to the extracellular domain of the ErbB monomers and monomer-monomer interaction establishes activating the activation loop in a kinase domain, that activates the further process of transphosphorylation of the specific tyrosine kinases in the kinase domain of ErbB's intracellular part. It is a complex process due to the domain specificity and nature of the members of ErbB family. Notably, the ErbB1 and ErbB4 are the two most studied and intact among the family of ErbB proteins, Which forms functional intracellular tyrosine kinases. ErbB2 has no known binding ligand and absent of an active kinase domain in ErbB3 make this duo preferable to form heterodimers & share each other's active domains to activate transphosphorylation of the tyrosine kinases. The specific tyrosine molecules mainly trans or auto-phosphorylated are at the site Y992, Y1045, Y1068, Y1148, Y1173 in the tail region of the ErbB monomer. For the activation of kinase domain in the ErbB dimer, asymmetric kinase domain dimer of the two monomers is required with the intact asymmetric (N-C lobe) interface at the site of adjoining monomers. Activation of the tyrosine kinase domain leads to the activation of the whole range of downstream signaling pathways like PLCγ, ERK 1/2, p38 MAPK, PI3-K/Akt and more with the cell.

When not bound to a ligand, the extracellular regions of ErbB1, ErbB3, and ErbB4 are found in a tethered conformation in which a 10-amino-acid-long dimerization arm is unable to mediate monomer-monomer interactions. In contrast, in ligand-bound ErbB-1 and unliganded ErbB-2, the dimerization arm becomes untethered and exposed at the receptor surface, making monomer-monomer interactions and dimerisation possible. The consequence of ectodomain dimerization is the positioning of two cytoplasmic domains such that transphosphorylation of specific tyrosine, serine, and threonine amino acids can occur within the cytoplasmic domain of each ErbB. At least 10 specific tyrosines, 7 serines, and 2 threonines have been identified within the cytoplasmic domain of ErbB-1, that may become phosphorylated and in some cases de-phosphorylated (e.g., Tyr 992) upon receptor dimerization. Although a number of potential phosphorylation sites exist, upon dimerization only one or much more rarely two of these sites are phosphorylated at any one time.

== Role in cancer ==
Phosphorylated tyrosine residues act as binding sites for intracellular signal activators such as Ras. The Ras-Raf-MAPK pathway is a major signalling route for the ErbB family, as is the PI3-K/AKT pathway, both of which lead to increased cell proliferation and inhibition of apoptosis.

Genetic Ras mutations are infrequent in breast cancer but Ras may be pathologically activated in breast cancer by overexpression of ErbB receptors. Activation of the receptor tyrosine kinases generates a signaling cascade where the Ras GTPase proteins are activated to a GTP-bound state. The RAS pathway can couple with the mitogen-activated protein kinase pathway or a number of other possible effectors.

The PI3K/Akt pathway is dysregulated in many human tumors because of mutations altering proteins in the pathway. In relation to breast tumors, somatic activating mutations in Akt and the p110α subunit of the PI3K have been detected in 3–5% and 20–25% of primary breast tumors, respectively. Many breast tumors also have lower levels of PTEN, which is a lipid phosphatase that dephosphorylates phosphatidylinositol (3,4,5)-trisphosphate, thereby reversing the action of PI3K.

EGFR has been found to be overexpressed in many cancers such as gliomas and non-small-cell lung carcinoma. Drugs such as panitumumab, cetuximab, gefitinib, erlotinib, afatinib, and lapatinib are used to inhibit it. Cetuximab is a chimeric human: murin immunoglobulin G1 mAb that binds EGFR with high affinity and promotes EGFR internalization. It has recently been shown that acquired resistance to cetuximab and gefitinib can be linked to hyperactivity of ErbB-3. This is linked to an acquired overexpression of c-MET, which phosphorylates ErbB-3, which in turn activates the AKT pathway. Panitumumab is a human mAb with high EGFR affinity that blocks ligand-binding to induce EGFR internalization. Panitumumab efficacy has been tested in a variety of advanced cancer patients, including renal carcinomas and metastatic colorectal cancer in clinical trials.

ErbB2 overexpression can occur in breast, ovarian, bladder, non-small-cell lung carcinoma, as well as several other tumor types. Trastuzumab or Herceptin inhibits downstream signal cascades by selectively binding to the extracellular domain of ErbB-2 receptors to inhibit it. This leads to decreased proliferation of tumor cells. Trastuzumab targets tumor cells and causes apoptosis through the immune system by promoting antibody-dependent cellular cytotoxicity. Two thirds of women respond to trastuzumab. Although herceptin works well in most breast cancer cases, it has not been yet elucidated as to why some HER2-positive breast cancers don't respond well. Research suggests that a low FISH test ratio in estrogen receptor positive breast cancers are less likely to respond to this drug. ErbB expression has also been linked to cutaneous Squamous Cell Carcinoma (cSCC) development, where the over-expression of these receptors has been found in cSCC tumors. Based on a study conducted by Cañueto et al. (2017), ErbB over-expression in tumors was linked to lymph node progression and metastasis stage progression in cSCC.
