= ERBB3 =

Protein found in humans

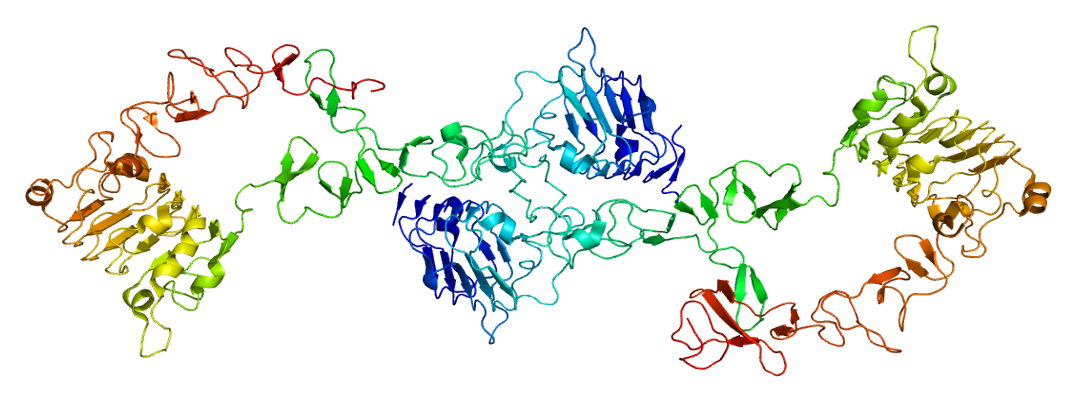

Identifiers
- Aliases: ERBB3, ErbB-3, HER3, LCCS2, MDA-BF-1, c-erbB-3, c-erbB3, erbB3-S, p180-ErbB3, p45-sErbB3, p85-sErbB3, erb-b2 receptor tyrosine kinase 3, FERLK, VSCN1
- External IDs: OMIM: 190151; MGI: 95411; GeneCards: ERBB3
Available structures
PDB	Ortholog search: PDBe RCSB
PDB	List of PDB id codes 1M6B, 2L9U, 3KEX, 3LMG, 3P11, 4LEO, 4OTW, 4P59, 4RIW, 4RIX, 4RIY, 5CUS
Enzyme activity
EC #	BRENDA	ExPASy	KEGG	MetaCyc
2.7.10.1	↗	↗	↗	↗

Gene location (Human)
Chr.	Chromosome 12 (human)
Band	12q13.2	Start	56,076,799 bp
Band	12q13.2	End	56,103,505 bp

Gene location (Mouse)
Chr.	Chromosome 10 (mouse)
Band	10 D3|10 77.1 cM	Start	128,403,392 bp
Band	10 D3|10 77.1 cM	End	128,425,521 bp
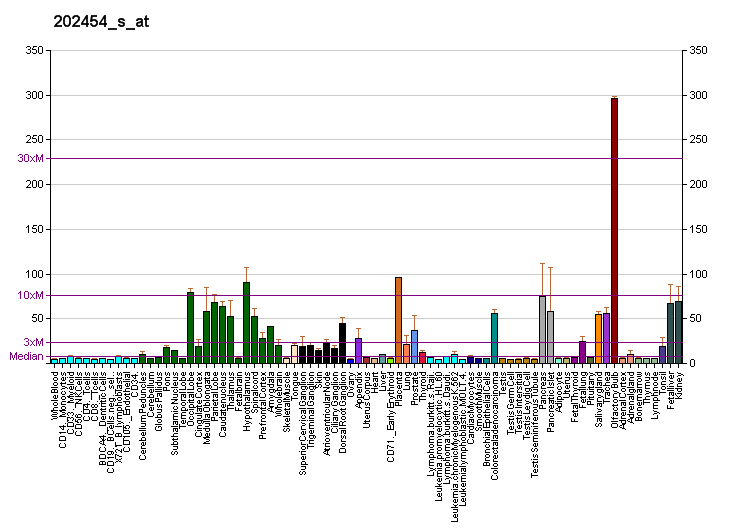
RNA expression pattern
Bgee	Human / Mouse (ortholog); Top expressed in: trigeminal ganglion; jejunal mucosa; spinal ganglia; inferior ganglion of vagus nerve; corpus callosum; mucosa of colon; mucosa of ileum; mucosa of sigmoid colon; duodenum; external globus pallidus / Top expressed in: left colon; jejunum; ileum; intestinal villus; transitional epithelium of urinary bladder; lacrimal gland; epidermis; hair follicle; conjunctival fornix; sciatic nerve; More reference expression data
BioGPS	More reference expression data
Gene ontology
Molecular function	transferase activity; nucleotide binding; protein kinase activity; protein tyrosine kinase activator activity; growth factor binding; protein homodimerization activity; kinase activity; protein binding; identical protein binding; protein heterodimerization activity; ATP binding; transmembrane signaling receptor activity; neuregulin binding; phosphatidylinositol-4,5-bisphosphate 3-kinase activity; protein tyrosine kinase activity; ubiquitin protein ligase binding; receptor tyrosine kinase; neuregulin receptor activity; transmembrane receptor protein tyrosine kinase activity
Cellular component	integral component of membrane; lateral plasma membrane; membrane; plasma membrane; integral component of plasma membrane; extracellular region; basolateral plasma membrane; apical plasma membrane; intracellular anatomical structure; receptor complex; extracellular space; cytoplasm; basal plasma membrane
Biological process	neuron apoptotic process; negative regulation of cell adhesion; phosphorylation; endocardial cushion development; positive regulation of protein tyrosine kinase activity; wound healing; MAPK cascade; positive regulation of calcineurin-NFAT signaling cascade; development of the heart; protein phosphorylation; negative regulation of secretion; regulation of cell population proliferation; extrinsic apoptotic signaling pathway in absence of ligand; phosphatidylinositol 3-kinase signaling; positive regulation of phosphatidylinositol 3-kinase signaling; negative regulation of signal transduction; signal transduction; cranial nerve development; negative regulation of neuron apoptotic process; Schwann cell differentiation; phosphatidylinositol phosphate biosynthetic process; regulation of cell motility; peripheral nervous system development; transmembrane receptor protein tyrosine kinase signaling pathway; ERBB2 signaling pathway; peptidyl-tyrosine phosphorylation; positive regulation of cardiac muscle tissue development; positive regulation of gene expression; positive regulation of protein kinase B signaling; cell differentiation; negative regulation of apoptotic process; positive regulation of ERK1 and ERK2 cascade; nervous system development; positive regulation of cell population proliferation
Sources:Amigo / QuickGO
Orthologs
Databases	NCBI: entry; OMA: entry
Species	Human	Mouse
Entrez	2065	13867
Ensembl	ENSG00000065361	ENSMUSG00000018166
UniProt	P21860	Q61526
RefSeq (mRNA)	NM_001982; NM_001005915	NM_010153
RefSeq (protein)	NP_001005915; NP_001973	NP_034283
Location (UCSC)	Chr 12: 56.08 – 56.1 Mb	Chr 10: 128.4 – 128.43 Mb
PubMed search
- Wikidata
View/Edit Human	View/Edit Mouse

Receptor tyrosine-protein kinase erbB-3, also known as HER3 (human epidermal growth factor receptor 3), is a membrane bound protein that in humans is encoded by the ERBB3 gene.

ErbB3 is a member of the epidermal growth factor receptor (EGFR/ERBB) family of receptor tyrosine kinases. The kinase-impaired ErbB3 is known to form active heterodimers with other members of the ErbB family, most notably the ligand binding-impaired ErbB2.

== Gene and expression ==
The human ERBB3 gene is located on the long arm of chromosome 12 (12q13). It is encoded by 23,651 base pairs and translates into 1342 amino acids.

During human development, ERBB3 is expressed in skin, bone, muscle, nervous system, heart, lungs, and intestinal epithelium. ERBB3 is expressed in normal adult human gastrointestinal tract, reproductive system, skin, nervous system, urinary tract, and endocrine system.

== Structure ==
ErbB3, like the other members of the ErbB receptor tyrosine kinase family, consists of an extracellular domain, a transmembrane domain, and an intracellular domain. The extracellular domain contains four subdomains (I-IV). Subdomains I and III are leucine-rich and are primarily involved in ligand binding. Subdomains II and IV are cysteine-rich and most likely contribute to protein conformation and stability through the formation of disulfide bonds. Subdomain II also contains the dimerization loop required for dimer formation. The cytoplasmic domain contains a juxtamembrane segment, a kinase domain, and a C-terminal domain.

Unliganded receptor adopts a conformation that inhibits dimerization. Binding of neuregulin to the ligand binding subdomains (I and III) induces a conformational change in ErbB3 that causes the protrusion of the dimerization loop in subdomain II, activating the protein for dimerization.

== Function ==
ErbB3 has been shown to bind the ligands heregulin and NRG-2. Ligand binding causes a change in conformation that allows for dimerization, phosphorylation, and activation of signal transduction. ErbB3 can heterodimerize with any of the other three ErbB family members. The theoretical ErbB3 homodimer would be non-functional because the kinase-impaired protein requires transphosphorylation by its binding partner to be active.

Unlike the other ErbB receptor tyrosine kinase family members which are activated through autophosphorylation upon ligand binding, ErbB3 was found to be kinase impaired, having only 1/1000 the autophosphorylation activity of EGFR and no ability to phosphorylate other proteins. Therefore, ErbB3 must act as an allosteric activator.

=== Interaction with ErbB2 ===
The ErbB2-ErbB3 dimer is considered the most active of the possible ErbB dimers, in part because ErbB2 is the preferred dimerization partner of all the ErbB family members, and ErbB3 is the preferred partner of ErbB2. This heterodimer conformation allows the signaling complex to activate multiple pathways including the MAPK, PI3K/Akt, and PLCγ. There is also evidence that the ErbB2-ErbB3 heterodimer can bind and be activated by EGF-like ligands.

=== Activation of the PI3K/Akt pathway ===
The intracellular domain of ErbB3 contains 6 recognition sites for the SH2 domain of the p85 subunit of PI3K. ErbB3 binding causes the allosteric activation of p110α, the lipid kinase subunit of PI3K, a function not found in either EGFR or ErbB2.

== Role in cancer ==
While no evidence has been found that ErbB3 overexpression, constitutive activation, or mutation alone is oncogenic, the protein as a heterodimerization partner, most critically with ErbB2, is implicated in growth, proliferation, chemotherapeutic resistance, and the promotion of invasion and metastasis.

ErbB3 is associated with targeted therapeutic resistance in numerous cancers including resistance to:

- HER2 inhibitors in HER2+ breast cancers
- anti-estrogen therapy in ER^{+} breast cancers
- EGFR inhibitors in lung and head and neck cancers
- hormones in prostate cancers
- IGF1R inhibitors in hepatomas
- BRAF inhibitors in melanoma

ErbB2 overexpression may promote the formation of active heterodimers with ErbB3 and other ErbB family members without the need for ligand binding, resulting in weak but constitutive signaling activity.

== Role in normal development ==
ERBB3 is expressed in the mesenchyme of the endocardial cushion, which will later develop into the valves of the heart. ErbB3 null mouse embryos show severely underdeveloped atrioventricular valves, leading to death at embryonic day 13.5. Although this function of ErbB3 depends on neuregulin, it does not seem to require ErbB2, which is not expressed in the tissue.

ErbB3 also seems to be required for neural crest differentiation and the development of the sympathetic nervous system and neural crest derivatives such as Schwann cells.

== See also ==
- Epidermal growth factor receptor family
- Epidermal growth factor receptor
- Receptor tyrosine-kinases
