= HER2 =

Mammalian protein found in humans

ERBB2
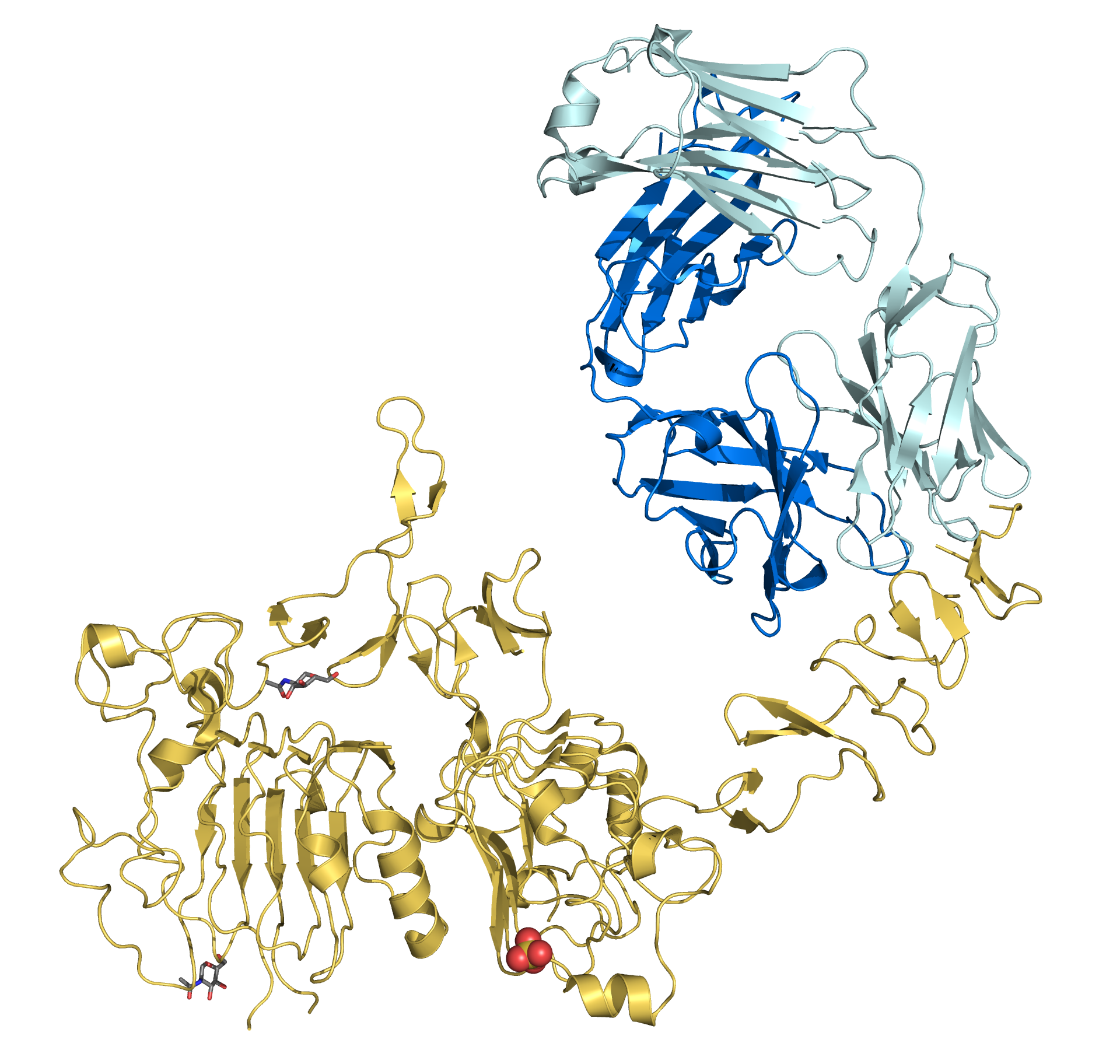

Identifiers
- Aliases: ERBB2, CD340, HER-2, HER-2/neu, HER2, MLN 19, NEU, NGL, TKR1, erb-b2 receptor tyrosine kinase 2
- External IDs: OMIM: 164870; MGI: 95410; GeneCards: ERBB2
Available structures
PDB	Ortholog search: PDBe RCSB
PDB	List of PDB id codes 1MFG, 1MFL, 1MW4, 1N8Z, 1QR1, 1S78, 2A91, 2JWA, 2KS1, 2L4K, 3BE1, 3H3B, 3N85, 3PP0, 3RCD, 3MZW, 3WLW, 3WSQ, 4GFU, 4HRL, 4HRM, 4HRN, 2N2A
Enzyme activity
EC #	BRENDA	ExPASy	KEGG	MetaCyc
2.7.10.1	↗	↗	↗	↗

Gene location (Human)
Chr.	Chromosome 17 (human)
Band	17q12	Start	39,687,914 bp
Band	17q12	End	39,730,426 bp

Gene location (Mouse)
Chr.	Chromosome 11 (mouse)
Band	11 61.75 cM|11 D	Start	98,303,296 bp
Band	11 61.75 cM|11 D	End	98,328,542 bp
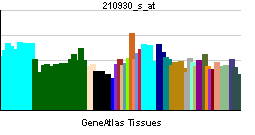

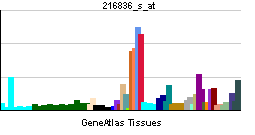
RNA expression pattern
Bgee	Human / Mouse (ortholog); Top expressed in: right uterine tube; sural nerve; skin of leg; skin of abdomen; renal medulla; minor salivary glands; right lobe of thyroid gland; olfactory zone of nasal mucosa; mucosa of transverse colon; left lobe of thyroid gland / Top expressed in: lip; intestinal villus; middle ear; Eustachian tube; oral mucosa; esophagus; colon; crypt of lieberkuhn of small intestine; right kidney; left colon; More reference expression data
BioGPS	More reference expression data
Gene ontology
Molecular function	ErbB-3 class receptor binding; transferase activity; nucleotide binding; protein kinase activity; protein dimerization activity; growth factor binding; RNA polymerase I core binding; kinase activity; protein C-terminus binding; protein binding; identical protein binding; protein heterodimerization activity; transmembrane receptor protein tyrosine kinase activity; protein tyrosine kinase activity; protein phosphatase binding; ATP binding; transmembrane signaling receptor activity; phosphatidylinositol-4,5-bisphosphate 3-kinase activity; receptor tyrosine kinase
Cellular component	integral component of membrane; membrane; myelin sheath; receptor complex; plasma membrane; basolateral plasma membrane; apical plasma membrane; perinuclear region of cytoplasm; endosome membrane; cytoplasmic vesicle; nucleus; cytoplasm; cytosol; integral component of plasma membrane; basal plasma membrane
Biological process	positive regulation of protein phosphorylation; peripheral nervous system development; regulation of transcription, DNA-templated; negative regulation of immature T cell proliferation in thymus; positive regulation of MAP kinase activity; phosphorylation; transmembrane receptor protein tyrosine kinase signaling pathway; positive regulation of epithelial cell proliferation; cellular response to growth factor stimulus; wound healing; oligodendrocyte differentiation; regulation of angiogenesis; positive regulation of translation; transcription, DNA-templated; nervous system development; MAPK cascade; protein phosphorylation; development of the heart; cell surface receptor signaling pathway; positive regulation of GTPase activity; positive regulation of cell growth; regulation of microtubule-based process; neuromuscular junction development; regulation of ERK1 and ERK2 cascade; myelination; protein autophosphorylation; phosphatidylinositol 3-kinase signaling; positive regulation of transcription by RNA polymerase I; cell population proliferation; positive regulation of transcription by RNA polymerase III; motor neuron axon guidance; enzyme linked receptor protein signaling pathway; signal transduction; positive regulation of cell adhesion; positive regulation of protein targeting to membrane; ERBB2 signaling pathway; phosphatidylinositol phosphate biosynthetic process; positive regulation of gene expression; peptidyl-tyrosine phosphorylation; regulation of cell motility; cellular response to epidermal growth factor stimulus; regulation of transcription by RNA polymerase II; negative regulation of ERBB signaling pathway; positive regulation of protein kinase B signaling; negative regulation of signal transduction; cell differentiation; negative regulation of apoptotic process; positive regulation of ERK1 and ERK2 cascade; intracellular signal transduction; positive regulation of cell population proliferation; neuron differentiation; positive regulation of MAPK cascade
Sources:Amigo / QuickGO
Orthologs
Databases	NCBI: entry; OMA: entry
Species	Human	Mouse
Entrez	2064	13866
Ensembl	ENSG00000141736	ENSMUSG00000062312
UniProt	P04626	P70424
RefSeq (mRNA)	NM_001005862; NM_001289936; NM_001289937; NM_001289938; NM_004448	NM_001003817; NM_010152
RefSeq (protein)	NP_001005862; NP_001276865; NP_001276866; NP_001276867; NP_004439 NP_001369711; NP_001369712; NP_001369713; NP_001369714; NP_001369715; NP_001369716; NP_001369717; NP_001369718; NP_001369719; NP_001369720; NP_001369721; NP_001369722; NP_001369723; NP_001369724; NP_001369725; NP_001369726; NP_001369727; NP_001369728; NP_001369729; NP_001369730; NP_001369731; NP_001369732; NP_001369733; NP_001369734; NP_001369735	NP_001003817
Location (UCSC)	Chr 17: 39.69 – 39.73 Mb	Chr 11: 98.3 – 98.33 Mb
PubMed search
- Wikidata
View/Edit Human	View/Edit Mouse

Receptor tyrosine-protein kinase erbB-2 is a protein that normally resides in the membranes of cells and is encoded by the ERBB2 gene. ERBB is abbreviated from erythroblastic oncogene B, a gene originally isolated from the avian genome. The human protein is also frequently referred to as HER2 (human epidermal growth factor receptor 2) or CD340 (cluster of differentiation 340).

HER2 is a member of the human epidermal growth factor receptor (HER/EGFR/ERBB) family. But contrary to other members of the ERBB family, HER2 does not directly bind ligand. HER2 activation results from heterodimerization with another ERBB member or by homodimerization when HER2 concentration are high, for instance in cancer. Amplification or over-expression of this oncogene has been shown to play an important role in the development and progression of certain aggressive types of breast cancer. In recent years the protein has become an important biomarker and target of therapy for approximately 30% of breast cancer patients.

== Name ==
HER2 is named as such due to structural similarities with human epidermal growth factor receptor 1, or HER1. The Neu alias of HER2 derives its name from the parent glioblastoma cell line - a type of neural tumor found in rodents. ErbB-2 was named for its similarity to avian erythroblastosis oncogene B, ErbB; the oncogene later shown to code for epidermal growth factor receptor, EGFR. Molecular cloning of EGFR discovered that HER2, Neu, and ErbB-2 are all encoded by the same orthologs.

== Gene ==
ERBB2, a known proto-oncogene, is located at the long arm of human chromosome 17 (17q12).

== Function ==
The ErbB family consists of four individual plasma membrane-bound receptor tyrosine kinases. One of these is erbB-2; the other members are erbB-1, erbB-3 (neuregulin-binding; lacks kinase domain), and erbB-4. All four contain an extracellular ligand binding domain, a transmembrane domain, and an intracellular domain that can interact with a multitude of signaling molecules and exhibit both ligand-dependent and ligand-independent activity. Notably, no ligands for HER2 have yet been identified. HER2 can heterodimerise with any of the other three receptors and is considered to be the preferred dimerisation partner of the other ErbB receptors. Dimerisation results in the clustering of receptors within lipid rafts and autophosphorylation of tyrosine residues within the cytoplasmic domain of the receptors to activate a variety of signaling pathways.

=== Signal transduction ===
Signaling pathways activated by HER2 include:

- mitogen-activated protein kinase (MAPK)
- phosphoinositide 3-kinase (PI3K/Akt)
- phospholipase C γ
- protein kinase C (PKC)
- signal transducer and activator of transcription (STAT)

In summary, signaling through the ErbB family of receptors promotes cell proliferation and opposes apoptosis, and therefore must be tightly regulated to prevent uncontrolled cell growth from occurring.

== Clinical significance ==
=== Cancer ===
Amplification, also known as over-expression of the ERBB2 gene, occurs in approximately 10-30% of breast cancers. HER2-positive breast cancers are associated with increased disease recurrence and a poor prognosis compared with other identifiably genetically distinct breast cancers; however, drug agents targeting HER2 have significantly and positively altered the otherwise poor prognosis of HER2-positive breast cancer. Over-expression of HER2 is also known to occur in adenocarcinomas of the lung, ovary, and stomach, and in aggressive forms of uterine cancer, such as uterine serous carcinoma. E.g., HER2 is over-expressed in approximately 7-34% of patients with gastric cancer and in 30% of salivary duct carcinomas. The ERBB2 gene is physically near the gene encoding GRB7 on chromosome 17. GRB7 is a proto-oncogene associated with breast, testicular germ cell, gastric, and esophageal tumours and is frequently co-amplified in cancer cells with HER2 amplification.

The high expression of HER2 correlates with better survival in esophageal adenocarcinoma.

The high amplification of HER2 copy number positively contributes to the survival time of gastric cardia adenocarcinoma patients.

=== Mutations ===
Furthermore, diverse structural alterations have been identified that cause ligand-independent firing of this receptor, doing so in the absence of receptor over-expression. HER2 is found in a variety of tumours and some of these tumours carry point mutations in the sequence specifying the transmembrane domain of HER2. Substitution of a valine for a glutamic acid or a glutamine in the transmembrane domain can result in the constitutive dimerisation of this protein in the absence of a ligand.

HER2 mutations have been found in non-small-cell lung cancers (NSCLC) and can direct treatment.

== As a drug target ==
HER2 is the target of the monoclonal antibody trastuzumab (marketed as Herceptin). Trastuzumab is effective only in cancers where HER2 is over-expressed. One year of trastuzumab therapy is recommended for all patients with HER2-positive breast cancer who are also receiving chemotherapy. Randomized trials have demonstrated no additional benefit beyond 12 months, whereas 6 months has been shown to be inferior to 12. Trastuzumab is administered intravenously weekly or every 3 weeks.

An important downstream effect of trastuzumab binding to HER2 is an increase in p27, a protein that halts cell proliferation. Another monoclonal antibody, Pertuzumab, which inhibits dimerisation of HER2 and HER3 receptors, was approved by the FDA for use in combination with trastuzumab in June 2012.

As of November 2015, there are a number of ongoing and recently completed clinical trials of novel targeted agents for HER2+ metastatic breast cancer, e.g. margetuximab.

Additionally, NeuVax (Galena Biopharma) is a peptide-based immunotherapy that directs "killer" T cells to target and destroy cancer cells that express HER2. It has entered phase 3 clinical trials.

It has been found that patients with ER+ (estrogen receptor positive)/HER2+ compared with ER-/HER2+ breast cancers may actually benefit more from drugs that inhibit the PI3K/AKT molecular pathway.

Over-expression of HER2 can also be suppressed by the amplification of other genes. Research is currently being conducted to discover which genes may have this desired effect.

The expression of HER2 is regulated by signaling through estrogen receptors. Normally, estradiol and tamoxifen acting through the estrogen receptor down-regulate the expression of HER2. However, when the ratio of the coactivator AIB-3 exceeds that of the corepressor PAX2, the expression of HER2 is upregulated in the presence of tamoxifen, leading to tamoxifen-resistant breast cancer.

Among approved anti-HER2 therapeutics are also tyrosine kinase inhibitors (such as lapatinib, neratinib, and tucatinib) and antibody-drug conjugates (ado-trastuzumab emtansine and trastuzumab deruxtecan).

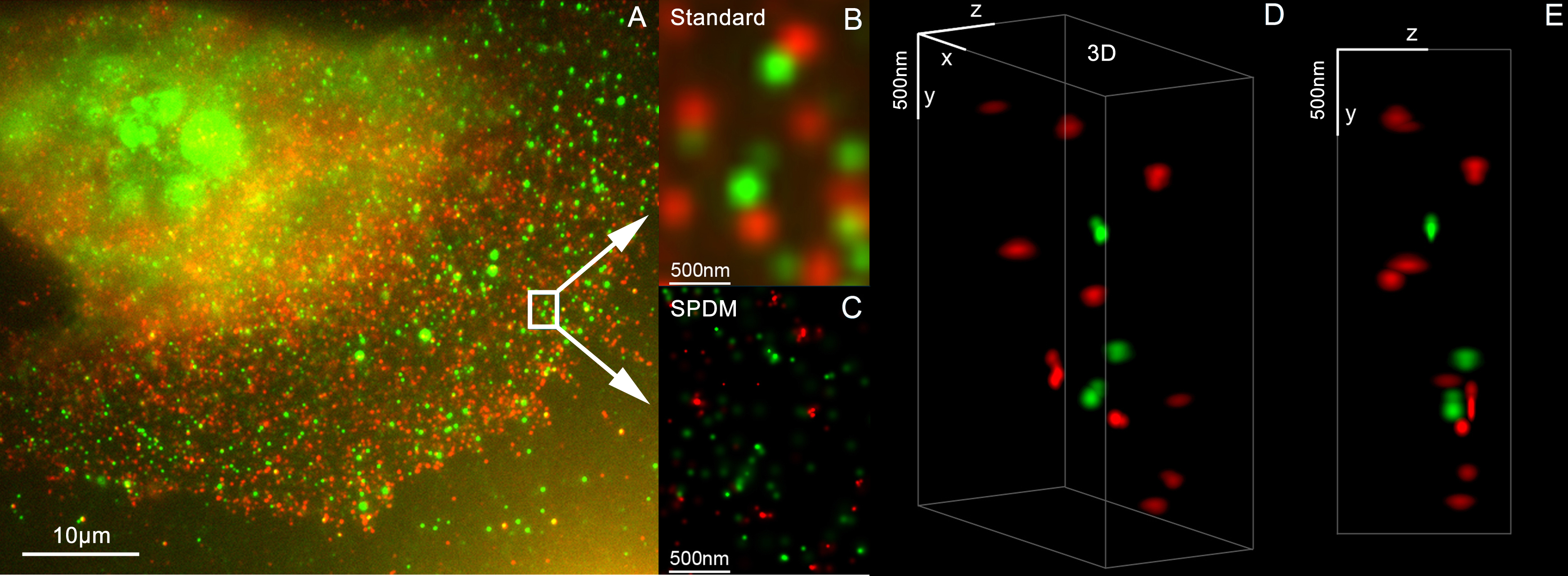
Her2 and Her3 distribution on a breast cell, (3D Dual Colour Super Resolution Microscopy SPDMphymod / LIMON, marked with Alexa 488 and 568)

== Diagnostics ==
HER2 testing is performed on breast biopsy of breast cancer patients to assess prognosis and to determine suitability for trastuzumab therapy. It is important that trastuzumab is restricted to HER2-positive individuals as it is expensive and has been associated with cardiac toxicity. For HER2-positive tumors, the benefits of trastuzumab clearly outweigh the risks.

Tests are usually performed on breast biopsy samples obtained by either fine-needle aspiration, core needle biopsy, vacuum-assisted breast biopsy, or surgical excision.

Immunohistochemistry (IHC) is generally used to measure the amount of HER2 protein present in the sample, with fluorescence in situ hybridisation (FISH) being used on samples that are equivocal in IHC. However, in several locations, FISH is used initially, followed by IHC in equivocal cases.

=== Immunohistochemistry ===
By immunohistochemistry, the sample is given a score based on the cell membrane staining pattern.

Immunohistochemistry
Score	Pattern	Status
0	Either: No staining observed.; Incomplete membrane staining that is faint or barely perceptible and within ≤10% of the invasive tumor cells	HER2 negative (not present)
1+	Incomplete membrane staining that is faint or barely perceptible and within >10% of the invasive tumor cells.	HER2 negative (not present)
2+	Weak to moderate complete membrane staining observed in >10% of tumor cells.	Borderline/Equivocal
3+	Circumferential membrane staining that is complete, intense, and in >10% of tumor cells.	HER2 positive

Micrographs showing each score:

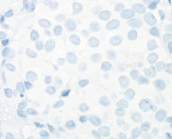
0

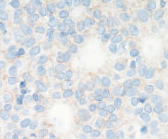
1+

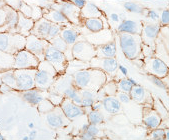
2+

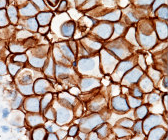
3+

=== Fluorescence in situ hybridisation ===
FISH can be used to measure the number of copies of the gene which are present and is thought to be more reliable than immunohistochemistry. It usually uses chromosome enumeration probe 17 (CEP17) to count the amount of chromosomes. Hence, the HER2/CEP17 ratio reflects any amplification of HER2 as compared to the number of chromosomes. The signals of 20 cells are usually counted.

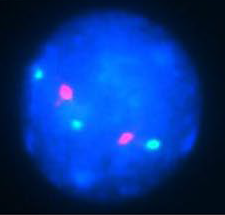
This cell displays 2 signals of HER2 (red) and 3 signals of CEP17 (green)

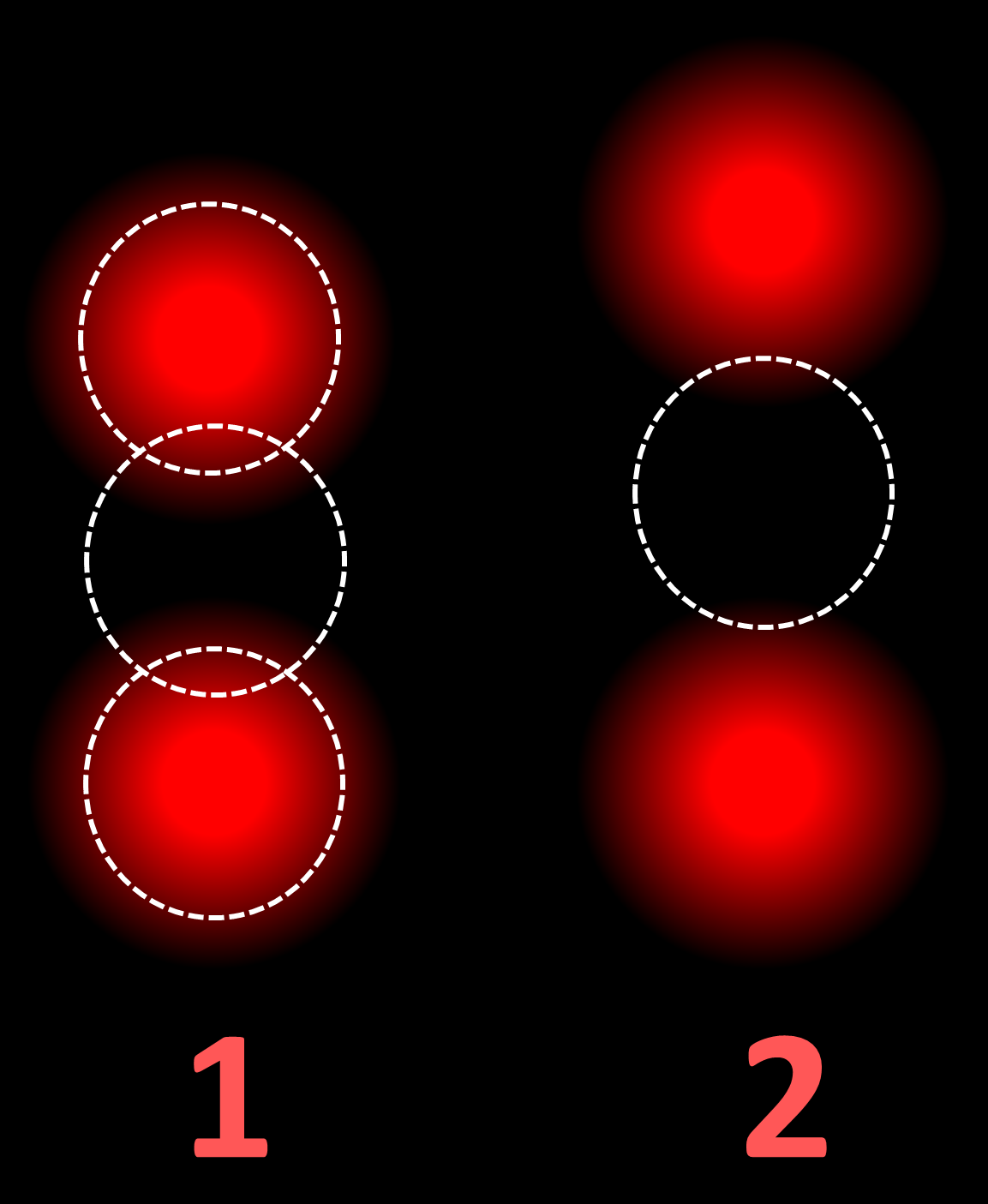
Two signals that are closer to each other than the signal diameter count as one.

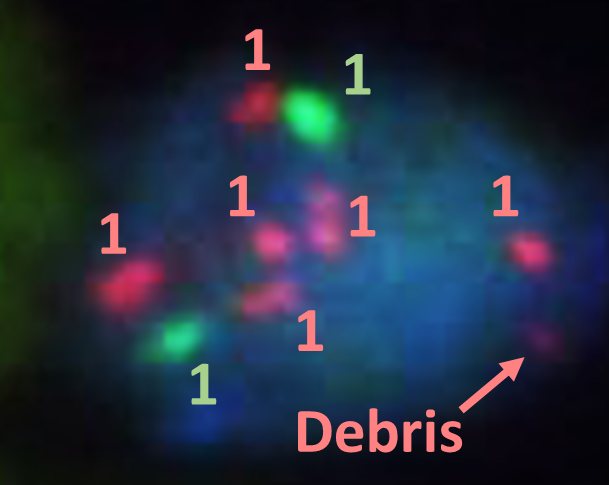
One of these signals is too faint, and is presumably debris.

Cells with only one type of signal are excluded from the count.

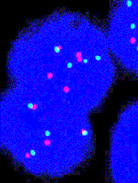
Overlapping cells are also excluded from the count.

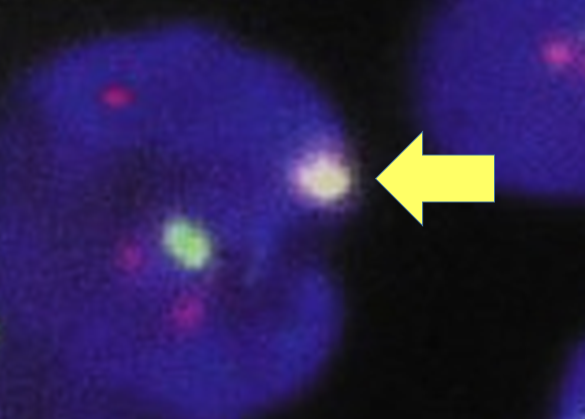
A yellow signal counts as one red and one green (which are overlapping)
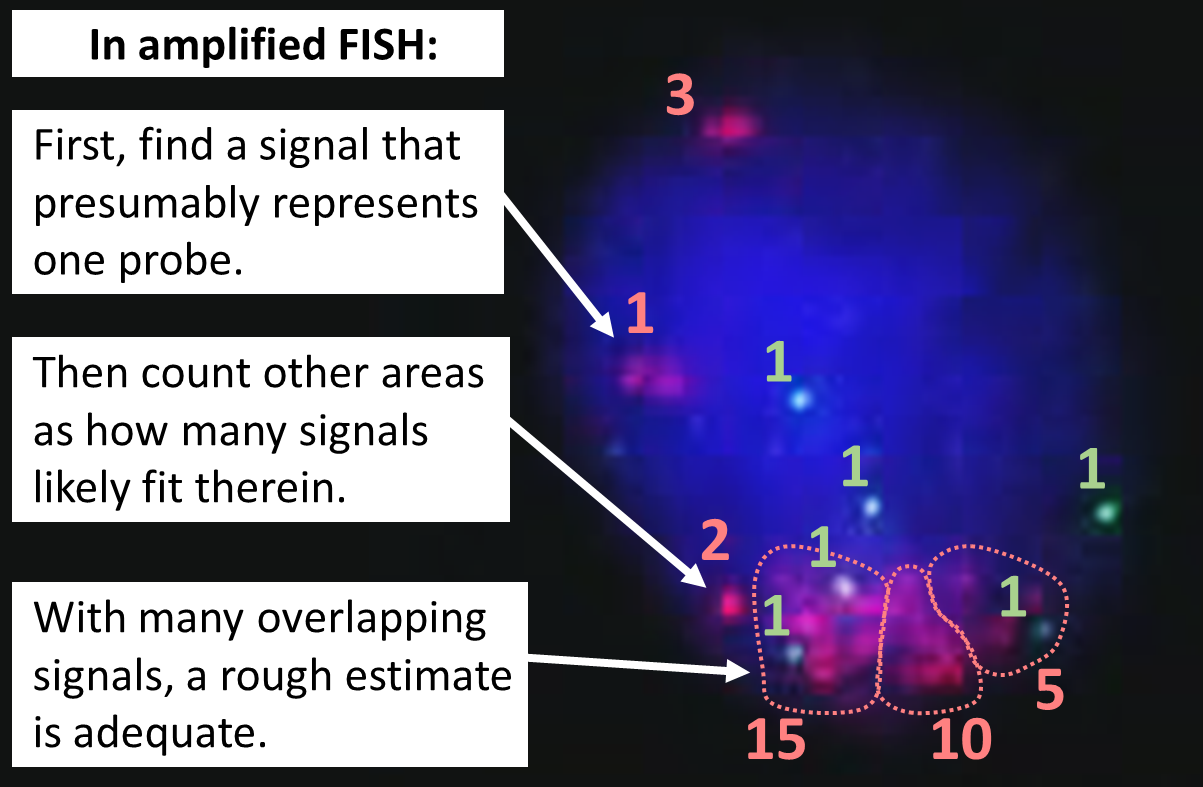

Algorithm for the evaluation of HER2 on fluorescence in situ hybridization (FISH).

Classification of HER2 by fluorescence in situ hybridization (FISH)
		HER2/CEP17 ratio	
		≥2.0	<2.0
Average HER2 copy number per cell	≥4.0	HER2 positive	Additional work-up required
Average HER2 copy number per cell	<4.0	Additional work-up required	HER2 negative

If the initial HER2 result is negative for a needle biopsy of a primary breast cancer, a new HER2 test may be performed on the subsequent breast excision.

=== Serum ===
The extracellular domain of HER2 can be shed from the surface of tumour cells and enter the circulation. Measurement of serum HER2 by enzyme-linked immunosorbent assay (ELISA) offers a far less invasive method of determining HER2 status than a biopsy and consequently has been extensively investigated. Results so far have suggested that changes in serum HER2 concentrations may be useful in predicting response to trastuzumab therapy. However, its ability to determine eligibility for trastuzumab therapy is less clear.

== Interactions ==
HER2/neu has been shown to interact with:

- CTNNB1
- DLG4
- Erbin
- GRB2
- HSP90AA1
- IL6ST
- MUC1
- PICK1 and
- PIK3R2
- PLCG1 and
- SHC1

== See also ==
- SkBr3 Cell Line, over-expresses HER2
