= Neuregulin 1 =

Protein-coding gene in the species Homo sapiens

NRG1
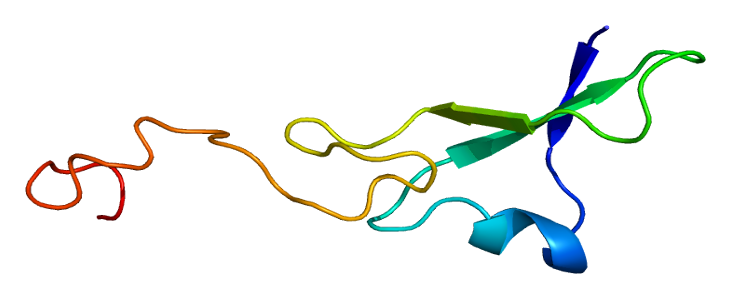

Identifiers
- Aliases: NRG1, ARIA, GGF, GGF2, HGL, HRG, HRG1, HRGA, MST131, MSTP131, NDF, NRG1-IT2, SMDF, neuregulin 1
- External IDs: OMIM: 142445; GeneCards: NRG1
Available structures
PDB	Human UniProt search: PDBe RCSB
PDB	List of PDB id codes 1HAE, 1HAF, 1HRE, 1HRF, 3U7U

Gene location (Human)
Chr.	Chromosome 8 (human)
Band	8p12	Start	31,639,222 bp
Band	8p12	End	32,855,666 bp
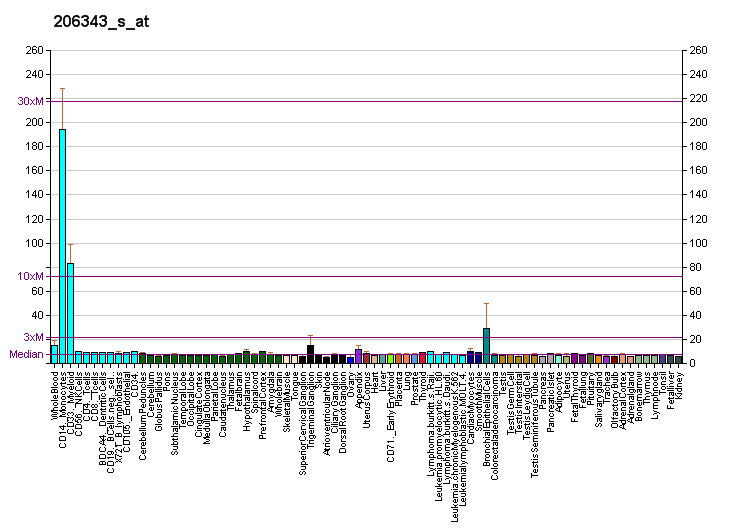
RNA expression pattern
Bgee	Human / Mouse (ortholog); Top expressed in: ventricular zone; ganglionic eminence; oocyte; secondary oocyte; monocyte; granulocyte; stromal cell of endometrium; spinal ganglia; gonad; endothelial cell / n/a; More reference expression data
BioGPS	More reference expression data
Gene ontology
Molecular function	transmembrane receptor protein tyrosine kinase activator activity; protein tyrosine kinase activator activity; signaling receptor binding; cytokine activity; transcription coregulator activity; growth factor activity; protein binding; chemorepellent activity; receptor tyrosine kinase binding; ErbB-2 class receptor binding; protein tyrosine kinase activity; phosphatidylinositol-4,5-bisphosphate 3-kinase activity; ErbB-3 class receptor binding; integrin binding
Cellular component	cytoplasm; membrane; synapse; extracellular region; nucleus; apical plasma membrane; integral component of membrane; neuromuscular junction; plasma membrane; axon; cell body; integral component of plasma membrane; dendrite; axolemma; external side of plasma membrane; nucleoplasm; extracellular space; glutamatergic synapse; GABA-ergic synapse
Biological process	cardiac conduction system development; embryo development; positive regulation of Ras protein signal transduction; muscle organ development; oligodendrocyte differentiation; positive regulation of dendritic spine development; mammary gland development; axon ensheathment; cell communication; chemorepulsion involved in interneuron migration from the subpallium to the cortex; positive regulation of cardiac muscle cell proliferation; positive regulation of protein localization to cell surface; positive regulation of striated muscle cell differentiation; cell population proliferation; locomotory behavior; negative regulation of protein catabolic process; transmembrane receptor protein tyrosine kinase signaling pathway; cardiac muscle cell differentiation; endocardial cell differentiation; development of the heart; positive regulation of cell growth; cardiac muscle cell myoblast differentiation; positive regulation of peptidyl-tyrosine phosphorylation; synapse assembly; positive regulation of cardiac muscle cell differentiation; positive regulation of axon extension; peripheral nervous system development; startle response; regulation of protein heterodimerization activity; wound healing; glial cell differentiation; nervous system development; ventricular trabecula myocardium morphogenesis; glial cell fate commitment; negative regulation of cardiac muscle cell apoptotic process; negative regulation of transcription, DNA-templated; regulation of protein homodimerization activity; neurotransmitter receptor metabolic process; positive regulation of protein kinase activity; negative regulation of neuron migration; neurogenesis; neural crest cell development; MAPK cascade; positive regulation of calcineurin-NFAT signaling cascade; positive regulation of myelination; brain development; negative regulation of secretion; cell morphogenesis; regulation of cell differentiation; ventricular cardiac muscle cell differentiation; positive regulation of phosphatidylinositol 3-kinase signaling; neuron fate commitment; negative regulation of extrinsic apoptotic signaling pathway in absence of ligand; cell migration; positive regulation of cell adhesion; positive regulation of transcription by RNA polymerase II; phosphatidylinositol phosphate biosynthetic process; positive regulation of gene expression; positive regulation of cell population proliferation; ERBB signaling pathway; activation of protein kinase B activity; regulation of cell motility; peptidyl-tyrosine phosphorylation; positive regulation of protein tyrosine kinase activity; ERBB2 signaling pathway; activation of transmembrane receptor protein tyrosine kinase activity; cardiac muscle tissue development; ERBB3 signaling pathway; regulation of signaling receptor activity; positive regulation of protein kinase B signaling; ERBB4 signaling pathway; positive regulation of peptidyl-tyrosine autophosphorylation; myelination in peripheral nervous system; intracellular signal transduction; postsynapse to nucleus signaling pathway
Sources:Amigo / QuickGO
Orthologs
Databases	NCBI: entry; OMA: entry
Species	Human	Mouse
Entrez	3084	n/a
Ensembl	ENSG00000157168	n/a
UniProt	Q02297; Q7RTW3	n/a
RefSeq (mRNA)	NM_001159995; NM_001159996; NM_001159999; NM_001160001; NM_001160002 NM_001160004; NM_001160005; NM_001160007; NM_001160008; NM_004495; NM_013956; NM_013957; NM_013958; NM_013959; NM_013960; NM_013962; NM_013964; NM_001322197; NM_001322201; NM_001322202; NM_001322205; NM_001322206; NM_001322207	n/a
RefSeq (protein)	NP_001153467; NP_001153468; NP_001153471; NP_001153473; NP_001153474 NP_001153476; NP_001153477; NP_001153479; NP_001153480; NP_001309126; NP_001309130; NP_001309131; NP_001309134; NP_001309135; NP_001309136; NP_004486; NP_039250; NP_039251; NP_039252; NP_039253; NP_039254; NP_039256; NP_039258; NP_039251.2; NP_001153471.1; NP_001309130.1	n/a
Location (UCSC)	Chr 8: 31.64 – 32.86 Mb	n/a
PubMed search		n/a
- Wikidata
View/Edit Human

Neuregulin 1, or NRG1, is a gene of the epidermal growth factor family that in humans is encoded by the NRG1 gene. NRG1 is one of four proteins in the neuregulin family that act on the EGFR family of receptors. Neuregulin 1 is produced in numerous isoforms by alternative splicing, which allows it to perform a wide variety of functions. It is essential for the normal development of the nervous system and the heart.

== Structure ==
Neuregulin 1 (NRG1) was originally identified as a 44-kD glycoprotein that interacts with the NEU/ERBB2 receptor tyrosine kinase to increase its phosphorylation on tyrosine residues. It is known that an extraordinary variety of different isoforms are produced from the NRG1 gene by alternative splicing. These isoforms include heregulins (HRGs), glial growth factors (GGFs) and sensory and motor neuron-derived factor (SMDF). They are tissue-specific and differ significantly in their structure. The HRG isoforms all contain immunoglobulin (Ig) and epidermal growth factor-like (EGF-like) domains. GGF and GGF2 isoforms contain a kringle-like sequence plus Ig and EGF-like domains; and the SMDF isoform shares only the EGF-like domain with other isoforms. The receptors for all NRG1 isoforms are the ERBB family of tyrosine kinase transmembrane receptors. Through their displayed interaction with ERBB receptors, NRG1 isoforms induce the growth and differentiation of epithelial, neuronal, glial, and other types of cells.

== Function ==
=== Synaptic plasticity ===
Neuregulin 1 is thought to play a role in synaptic plasticity. It has been shown that a loss of Neuregulin 1 within cortical projection neurons results in increased inhibitory connections and reduced synaptic plasticity. Similarly, overexpression of Neuregulin 1 results in disrupted excitatory-inhibitory connections, reduced synaptic plasticity, and abnormal dendritic spine growth. Mutations in human L1 cell adhesion molecules are reported to cause a number of neuronal disorders. In addition, recent research in Drosophila model has also shown Nrg's involvement in regulating dendritic pruning in ddaC neurons in a Rab5/ESCRT-mediated endocytic pathway. Thus, careful regulation of the amount of Neuregulin 1 must be maintained in order to preserve an intricate balance between excitatory and inhibitory connections within the central nervous system (CNS). Any disruption in this inhibitory system may contribute to impaired synaptic plasticity, a symptom endemic in schizophrenic patients.

== Isoforms ==
At least six major types (different N termini) of neuregulin 1 are known. Six types exist in humans and rodents (type I, II and III NRG1 are expressed in excitatory and inhibitory neurons, as well as astrocytes), and some types (I and IV) can be regulated by neuronal activity.

type	aliases
I	Heregulin, NEU differentiation factor (NDF), or acetylcholine receptor inducing activity (ARIA)
II	Glial Growth Factor-2 (GGF2)
III	Sensory and motor neuron-derived factor (SMDF)
IV	
V	
VI	

== Clinical significance ==
Neuregulin 1-ErbB4 interactions are thought to play a role in the pathological mechanism of schizophrenia. A high-risk deCODE (Icelandic) haplotype was discovered in 2002 on the 5'-end of the gene. The SNP8NRG243177 allele from this haplotype was associated in 2006 with a heightened expression of the Type IV NRG1 in the brains of people suffering from schizophrenia. Further, the NRG1-ErbB4 signalling complex has been highlighted as a potential target for new antipsychotic treatment.

Additionally, Neuregulin 1 has been shown to modulate anxiety-like behaviors. Endogenous Neuregulin 1 may bind to its receptor, ErbB4, expressed on GABAergic neurons within the basolateral amygdala. Administration of exogenous Neuregulin 1 to the basolateral amygdala of anxious mice produced an anxiolytic effect, which has been attributed to the enhancement of GABAergic neurotransmission. Thus, treatments aimed at reducing anxiety, which may contribute to emotional instability in many schizophrenic patients, by targeting the effects of mutations in NRG1 and ERBB4, may yield positive results for those afflicted by both anxiety disorders as well as schizophrenia.

Neuregulin has been shown to be involved in the myelination of central nervous system (CNS) axons. There exist at least two modes of myelination within the CNS—one that is independent of neuronal activity and another that is promoted by the activation of NMDA receptors by glutamate on oligodendrocytes. Neuregulin is involved in the "switching" of oligodendrocytes from the mode of myelination that is independent of neuronal activity to the mode that is dependent upon glutamate binding to NMDA receptors. It is thought that Neuregulin 1 found on axons of CNS neurons interacts with its receptor, ErbB4, to promote the myelination of that axon, and any disruption in this signaling contributes to decreased myelination. Since Neuregulin 1 promotes myelination and is decreased in schizophrenic patients, along with the finding that schizophrenic patients experience white matter deficits, mutations within Neuregulin 1 may underlie cognitive deficits associated with lower white matter integrity, especially within frontotemporal connections.

The protein also has the putative ability to protect the brain from damage induced by stroke. Those with a genetic variant of neuregulin 1 tended to be more creative.

There is evidence that NRG1 is a tumor suppressor gene.

There is also strong evidence that NRG1 plays a critical role in Schwann cell maturation, survival, and motility, important in research related to neurofibromatosis type two (NF2).

=== Heart ===
Neuregulin-1 (NRG-1), a cardioactive growth factor released from endothelial cells, is necessary for cardiac development, structural maintenance, and functional integrity of the heart. NRG-1 and its receptor family ErbB can play a beneficial role in the treatment of chronic heart failure (CHF) by promoting survival of cardiac myocytes, improving sarcomeric structure, balancing Ca2+ homeostasis, and enhancing pumping function. Downstream effectors of NRG-1/ErbB, include cardiac-specific myosin light chain kinase (cMLCK), Protein Phosphatase type 1 (PP1), sarcoplasmic reticulum Ca2+-ATPase 2 (SERCA2), and focal adhesion kinase (FAK). The beneficial effects of neuregulin-1 make recombinant human neuregulin-1 (rhNRG-1) a potential drug for treatment of CHF.

=== Maintenance of heart structure ===
NRG-1 treatment of adult rat ventricular myocytes stimulate the formation of a multiprotein complex between ErbB2, FAK, and p130(CAS), which modulates the restoration of cell–cell contacts between isolated myocytes, allowing for synchronous beating. Furthermore, FAK is also involved in the maintenance of sarcomeric organization, cell survival, and myocyte–myocyte interactions. The sarcomeric effects of NRG-1 protects myocytes against structural disarray induced by stressors, including cytotoxic agents.

=== Cardiomyocyte survival under stress ===
Under conditions of stress, including viral infection, cytotoxic agents, and oxidative stress, activation of NRG-1/ErbB signaling can protect myocardial cells against apoptosis. In contrast to embryonic and neonatal cardiomyocytes, adult myocardial cells are terminally differentiated and have lost the ability to proliferate. Therefore, growth of adult cardiac cells is commonly characterized by hypertrophy and an increased content of contractile proteins. However, studies have shown NRG-1 promotes myocardial regeneration through hyperplasia, and prevents hypertrophy surrounding infarcted areas.

=== Restoration of cardiomyocytes ===
The cMLCK protein is an important regulator of sarcomere assembly through activation of the myosin regulatory light chain, as well as playing a role in heart contractility. In contrast to smooth and skeletal muscle MLCKs, cMLCK expression is restricted to cardiac myocytes. Overexpression of cMLCK increases cell contractility. Treatment of cardiac myocytes with rhNRG-1 significantly upregulated cMLCK expression or activity??? in CHF rat models, together with an improvement in both cardiomyocyte structure and pumping function. Therefore, cMLCK is a downstream protein regulated by NRG-1/ErbB signaling and plays a role in rhNRG-1-mediated improvements in CHF.

=== Improvements in cardiac efficiency ===
Altered calcium homeostasis has been suggested to play a role in the development of heart failure. Modulated by phospholamban (PLB), SERCA2 regulates uptake of Ca2+ into the sarcoplasmic reticulum (SR) from the cytoplasm and contributes to the relaxation of cardiomyocytes. This process is also important for determining the SR Ca2+ load after relaxation and, thus, impacts on contractility. PP1 dephosphorylates PLB, inhibiting SERCA2 activity. In the failing heart, PP1 expression is upregulated, resulting in increased PLB dephosphorylation and decreased SERCA2 activity. Preliminary studies have revealed that rhNRG-normalizes SERCA function and enhances myocardial contractility through the inhibition of increasedPP1 expression, which leads to increased PLB phosphorylation and activation of SERCA2.

== Interactions ==
Neuregulin 1 has been shown to interact with ERBB3 and LIMK1. A schizophrenia associated- missense mutation in Neuregulin 1 has been shown to be associated with changes in cytokine expression using lymphoblastoid cells of heterozygous carriers vs homozygous wild type individuals

Specifically, the missense mutation involves a single nucleotide change of a valine to a leucine within the transmembrane domain of Type 3 Neuregulin 1. It is thought that this single nucleotide change affects the ability of γ-secretase to cleave the intracellular domain (ICD) of the Type 3 isoform of Neureglin 1. That is, the valine to leucine mutation within the transmembrane domain of Type 3 Neuregulin 1 decreases the amount of ICD that γ-secretase is able to cleave. The ICD of Type 3 Neuregulin 1 has been shown to suppress transcription of inflammatory cytokines, including IL-1β, IL-6, IL-10, IL-8, IL12-p70, and TNF-α. Using recombinant ErbB4 to stimulate the cleavage of the intracellular domain of Type 3 Neuregulin 1, a receptor for Type 3 Neuregulin 1, Marballi et al. showed that increased levels of the ICD lead to a decrease in IL-6 levels. Given the involvement of Neuregulin 1 in schizophrenia and the finding that the valine to leucine missense mutation in mice produces working memory deficits, NRG1 seems a likely genetic candidate that confers susceptibility to the development of schizophrenia.

== Association with schizophrenia ==
Mice were experimented on to find out more about the NRG1 gene and its link to schizophrenia and mood disorders along with physical impairments and locomotor function. They initially claimed that variants of the NRG1 and the Erb-B2 Receptor Tyrosine Kinase 4 (ERBB4) genes are possible risk factors for schizophrenia in humans. NRG1 serves as an epidermal growth factor for the receptors of the ERBB4 genes. Past research had shown that in human studies using post mortem brain tissue of schizophrenic patients had evidence of increased NRG1 and ErbB4 gene expression and hyperactivation. To test this, the authors used transgenic mice, or mice with altered genetic makeup. They were injected intraperitoneally of Cysteine-rich domain isoforms (CRD) of the NRG1 and then their behaviors were then observed within a controlled environment. They were later sacrificed by cervical dislocation and decapitation and their brains and ventricle regions were remapped into 3D data sets. The ventricle regions are notable because of their link to schizophrenia in humans if oversized or overstimulated. Certain brain risk pathways in adult humans are known, so the same pathways were replicated with the mice which allows for some external validity. Results of this experiment were slowed weight gain, ventricular enlargement, neuroinflammation, hyperactive locomotive activity, and reduced inhibitory neurotransmission in the NRG1 mice.

Polymorphisms in NRG1 may also affect psychotic symptoms for patients with schizophrenia. SNP rs6982890 is a single nucleotide polymorphism that when paired with NRG1 have a statistically significant higher immunoreactivity than if NRG1 is not paired. Meaning after 8 weeks of treatment, schizophrenic patients with the pairing of the SNP and peripheral plasma NRG1 showed significantly positive results compared to the individuals without the SNP. The study recruited participants from the Han population in China between 2010 and 2022. 1304 patients diagnosed with schizophrenia and 871 healthy controls were participants. The participant's peripheral plasma samples were sampled and stored. During the 8 week experiment, cognitive function was measured using the MATRICS Consensus Cognitive Battery (MCCB) which included many tests to assess all areas of cognition. Patients withe the CC genotype saw significant increase of peripheral plasma NRG1 immunoreactivity compared to patients with the CT genotype. This meant that the CC genotype had a more favorable response to treatment, which reinfcorces the notion that genetic makeup can determine the symptoms of schizophrenia and the immunoreactivity to treatments.

== Link to Major Depressive Disorder ==
Individuals diagnosed with Major Depressive Disorder (MDD) likely are living with an abnormal amount of NRG1 when compared to healthy controls. While looking for the most potent and predictive MDD related genes, NRG1 was the highest frequency among three out of four MDD populations. This was uncovered by the authors via machine learning techniques to create transcriptomic datasets of patients with MDD and healthy controls (HC). Differential Gene Expression (DGE) and Biomarker Mapping let the researchers map and compare patients with MDD and HC. To validate the Biomarkers, a non-invasive validation test took place by using saliva samples from the MDD patients to make sure the NRG1 biomarker was consistent with the transcriptomic analyses. NRG1 was the most robust and reliable biomarker to distinguish between patients with MDD and the HC group. NRG1 showed to have the highest expression in the main subcortical limbic brain regions known for association with depression.
