= ERBB4 =

Protein-coding gene in the species Homo sapiens

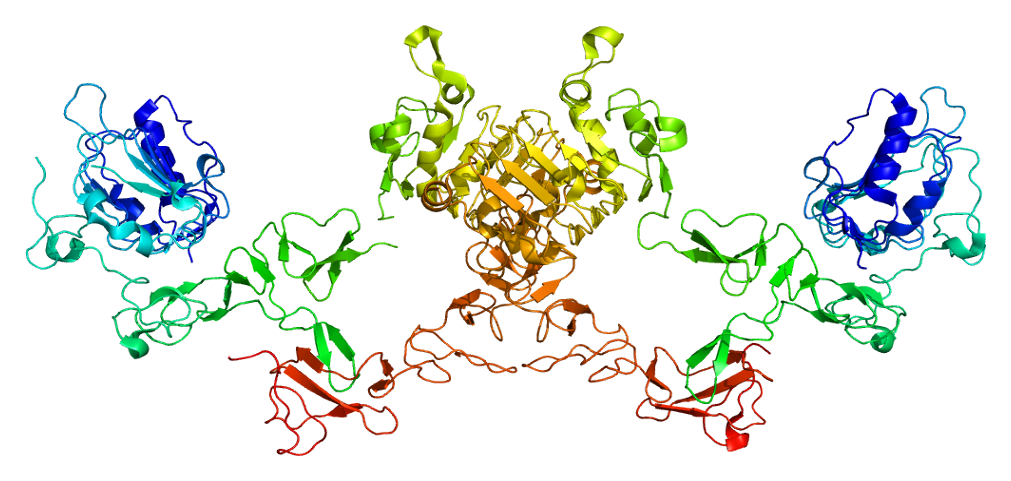

Identifiers
- Aliases: ERBB4, ALS19, HER4, p180erbB4, erb-b2 receptor tyrosine kinase 4
- External IDs: OMIM: 600543; MGI: 104771; GeneCards: ERBB4
Available structures
PDB	Ortholog search: PDBe RCSB
PDB	List of PDB id codes 2AHX, 2L2T, 2LCX, 2R4B, 3BBT, 3BBW, 3BCE, 3U2P, 3U7U, 3U9U
Enzyme activity
EC #	BRENDA	ExPASy	KEGG	MetaCyc
2.7.10.1	↗	↗	↗	↗

Gene location (Human)
Chr.	Chromosome 2 (human)
Band	2q34	Start	211,375,717 bp
Band	2q34	End	212,538,841 bp

Gene location (Mouse)
Chr.	Chromosome 1 (mouse)
Band	1 C3|1 33.8 cM	Start	68,071,345 bp
Band	1 C3|1 33.8 cM	End	69,147,218 bp
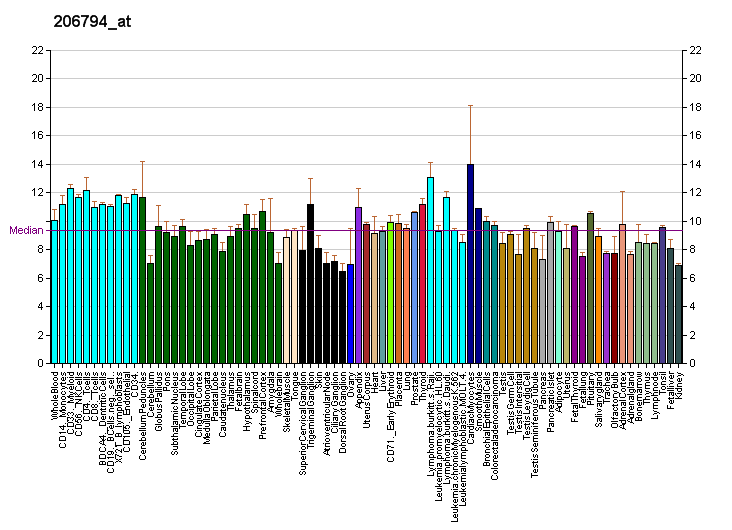
RNA expression pattern
Bgee	Human / Mouse (ortholog); Top expressed in: endothelial cell; secondary oocyte; optic nerve; middle temporal gyrus; buccal mucosa cell; Brodmann area 23; entorhinal cortex; Brodmann area 46; orbitofrontal cortex; right uterine tube / Top expressed in: dentate gyrus of hippocampal formation granule cell; superior frontal gyrus; interventricular septum; visual cortex; primary visual cortex; Cardiac muscle tissue of myocardium; cardiac muscle tissue of left ventricle; corneal stroma; plantaris muscle; gray matter layer of cerebellum; More reference expression data
BioGPS	More reference expression data
Gene ontology
Molecular function	transferase activity; nucleotide binding; protein kinase activity; protein homodimerization activity; epidermal growth factor receptor binding; kinase activity; protein binding; transmembrane receptor protein tyrosine kinase activity; ATP binding; protein tyrosine kinase activity; phosphatidylinositol-4,5-bisphosphate 3-kinase activity; receptor tyrosine kinase; transmembrane signaling receptor activity
Cellular component	integral component of membrane; cytosol; membrane; receptor complex; plasma membrane; nucleoplasm; extracellular region; mitochondrial matrix; basolateral plasma membrane; mitochondrion; nucleus; postsynaptic membrane; glutamatergic synapse; GABA-ergic synapse; integral component of presynaptic membrane; integral component of postsynaptic density membrane; cytoplasm; integral component of plasma membrane; basal plasma membrane
Biological process	mitochondrial fragmentation involved in apoptotic process; negative regulation of neuron migration; cell fate commitment; positive regulation of protein phosphorylation; regulation of cell migration; regulation of transcription, DNA-templated; olfactory bulb interneuron differentiation; embryonic pattern specification; phosphorylation; transmembrane receptor protein tyrosine kinase signaling pathway; central nervous system morphogenesis; mammary gland alveolus development; transcription, DNA-templated; nervous system development; mammary gland epithelial cell differentiation; MAPK cascade; positive regulation of phosphatidylinositol 3-kinase activity; positive regulation of transcription, DNA-templated; multicellular organism development; development of the heart; protein phosphorylation; positive regulation of cardiac muscle cell proliferation; neural crest cell migration; positive regulation of ERK1 and ERK2 cascade; positive regulation of protein localization to cell surface; protein autophosphorylation; cardiac muscle tissue regeneration; positive regulation of phosphatidylinositol 3-kinase signaling; peptidyl-tyrosine phosphorylation; lactation; cell population proliferation; cell migration; signal transduction; negative regulation of cell population proliferation; apoptotic process; ERBB2 signaling pathway; phosphatidylinositol phosphate biosynthetic process; peptidyl-tyrosine autophosphorylation; positive regulation of cell population proliferation; positive regulation of apoptotic process; regulation of cell motility; negative regulation of apoptotic process; cellular response to epidermal growth factor stimulus; positive regulation of tyrosine phosphorylation of STAT protein; positive regulation of protein kinase B signaling; positive regulation of receptor signaling pathway via JAK-STAT; synapse assembly; negative regulation of signal transduction; cell differentiation
Sources:Amigo / QuickGO
Orthologs
Databases	NCBI: entry; OMA: entry
Species	Human	Mouse
Entrez	2066	13869
Ensembl	ENSG00000178568	ENSMUSG00000062209
UniProt	Q15303	Q61527
RefSeq (mRNA)	NM_001042599; NM_005235	NM_010154
RefSeq (protein)	NP_001036064; NP_005226	NP_034284
Location (UCSC)	Chr 2: 211.38 – 212.54 Mb	Chr 1: 68.07 – 69.15 Mb
PubMed search
- Wikidata
View/Edit Human	View/Edit Mouse

Receptor tyrosine-protein kinase erbB-4 is an enzyme that in humans is encoded by the ERBB4 gene. Alternatively spliced variants that encode different protein isoforms have been described; however, not all variants have been fully characterized.

== Function ==
Receptor tyrosine-protein kinase erbB-4 is a receptor tyrosine kinase that is a member of the epidermal growth factor receptor family. ERBB4 is a single-pass type I transmembrane protein with multiple furin-like cysteine rich domains, a tyrosine kinase domain, a phosphotidylinositol-3 kinase binding site and a PDZ domain binding motif. The protein binds to and is activated by neuregulins-2, -3 and -4, heparin-binding EGF-like growth factor and betacellulin. Ligand binding induces a variety of cellular responses including mitogenesis and differentiation. Multiple proteolytic events allow for the release of a cytoplasmic fragment and an extracellular fragment.

== Clinical significance ==
Mutations in this gene have been associated with cancer. Other single-nucleotide polymorphisms and a risk haplotype have been linked to schizophrenia. Single-nucleotide polymorphisms in ERBB4 have also been found in a study of patients with familial amyotrophic lateral sclerosis type 19.

== Interactions ==
ERBB4 has been shown to interact with:

- DLG4
- NRG1,
- STAT5A, and
- YAP1.
