= List of MeSH codes (D23) =

The following is a partial list of the "D" codes for Medical Subject Headings (MeSH), as defined by the United States National Library of Medicine (NLM).

This list continues the information at List of MeSH codes (D20). Codes following these are found at List of MeSH codes (D25). For other MeSH codes, see List of MeSH codes.

The source for this content is the MeSH Browser from the NLM.

== MeSH D23 – biological factors ==
=== MeSH D23.050 – antigens ===
==== MeSH D23.050.063 – allergens ====
- MeSH D23.050.063.500 – allergoids

==== MeSH D23.050.161 – antigens, bacterial ====
- MeSH D23.050.161.050 – adhesins, bacterial
- MeSH D23.050.161.050.040 – adhesins, escherichia coli
- MeSH D23.050.161.386 – lepromin
- MeSH D23.050.161.616 – polysaccharides, bacterial
- MeSH D23.050.161.616.525 – lipopolysaccharides
- MeSH D23.050.161.616.525.500 – lipid a
- MeSH D23.050.161.616.525.600 – o antigens
- MeSH D23.050.161.616.594 – peptidoglycan
- MeSH D23.050.161.616.797 – teichoic acids
- MeSH D23.050.161.821 – staphylococcal protein a
- MeSH D23.050.161.845 – tuberculin

==== MeSH D23.050.202 – antigens, fungal ====
- MeSH D23.050.202.180 – coccidioidin
- MeSH D23.050.202.283 – fungal polysaccharides
- MeSH D23.050.202.386 – histoplasmin
- MeSH D23.050.202.800 – trichophytin

==== MeSH D23.050.244 – antigens, heterophile ====
- MeSH D23.050.244.436 – forssman antigen

==== MeSH D23.050.285 – antigens, neoplasm ====
- MeSH D23.050.285.018 – cd24 antigen
- MeSH D23.050.285.022 – cd52 antigen
- MeSH D23.050.285.025 – ki-1 antigen
- MeSH D23.050.285.040 – basigin
- MeSH D23.050.285.050 – antigens, tumor-associated, carbohydrate
- MeSH D23.050.285.050.050 – lewis x antigen
- MeSH D23.050.285.050.050.500 – sialyl lewis x antigen
- MeSH D23.050.285.050.119 – ca-19-9 antigen
- MeSH D23.050.285.050.225 – ca-125 antigen
- MeSH D23.050.285.050.300 – mucin-1
- MeSH D23.050.285.062 – antigens, viral, tumor
- MeSH D23.050.285.062.045 – adenovirus e1a proteins
- MeSH D23.050.285.062.050 – adenovirus e1b proteins
- MeSH D23.050.285.062.090 – antigens, polyomavirus transforming
- MeSH D23.050.285.196 – carbonic anhydrase ix
- MeSH D23.050.285.329 – carcinoembryonic antigen
- MeSH D23.050.285.357 – epithelial cell adhesion molecule
- MeSH D23.050.285.384 – folate receptor 1
- MeSH D23.050.285.439 – melanoma-specific antigens
- MeSH D23.050.285.439.249 – cd146 antigen
- MeSH D23.050.285.439.500 – gp100 melanoma antigen
- MeSH D23.050.285.439.750 – mart-1 antigen
- MeSH D23.050.285.550 – neprilysin
- MeSH D23.050.285.625 – prostate-specific antigen
- MeSH D23.050.285.733 – pancreatitis-associated proteins
- MeSH D23.050.285.840 – tissue polypeptide antigen

==== MeSH D23.050.290 – antigens, nuclear ====
- MeSH D23.050.290.249 – epstein-barr virus nuclear antigens
- MeSH D23.050.290.500 – ki-67 antigen
- MeSH D23.050.290.625 – ku autoantigen
- MeSH D23.050.290.750 – proliferating cell nuclear antigen
- MeSH D23.050.290.875 – snrnp core proteins

==== MeSH D23.050.293 – antigens, protozoan ====
- MeSH D23.050.293.500 – merozoite surface protein 1
- MeSH D23.050.293.900 – variant surface glycoproteins, trypanosoma

==== MeSH D23.050.301 – antigens, surface ====
- MeSH D23.050.301.264 – antigens, differentiation
- MeSH D23.050.301.264.035 – antigens, cd
- MeSH D23.050.301.264.035.100 – antigens, cd1
- MeSH D23.050.301.264.035.100.500 – antigens, cd1d
- MeSH D23.050.301.264.035.100.750 – cd163 antigen
- MeSH D23.050.301.264.035.107 – antigens, cd7
- MeSH D23.050.301.264.035.119 – antigens, cd19
- MeSH D23.050.301.264.035.120 – antigens, cd20
- MeSH D23.050.301.264.035.134 – antigens, cd34
- MeSH D23.050.301.264.035.567 – cd68 molecule
- MeSH D23.050.301.264.035.783 – cd83 antigen
- MeSH D23.050.301.264.051 – antigens, differentiation, b-lymphocyte
- MeSH D23.050.301.264.051.101 – cd5 antigens
- MeSH D23.050.301.264.051.119 – antigens, cd19
- MeSH D23.050.301.264.051.120 – antigens, cd20
- MeSH D23.050.301.264.051.140 – cd40 antigens
- MeSH D23.050.301.264.894 – antigens, differentiation, t-lymphocyte
- MeSH D23.050.301.264.894.080 – antigens, cd1
- MeSH D23.050.301.264.894.080.500 – antigens, cd1d
- MeSH D23.050.301.264.894.090 – cd2 antigens
- MeSH D23.050.301.264.894.093 – t lineage-specific activation antigen 1
- MeSH D23.050.301.264.894.095 – cd3 complex
- MeSH D23.050.301.264.894.095.800 – receptor-cd3 complex, antigen, t-cell
- MeSH D23.050.301.264.894.100 – cd4 antigens
- MeSH D23.050.301.264.894.101 – cd5 antigens
- MeSH D23.050.301.264.894.107 – antigens, cd7
- MeSH D23.050.301.264.894.108 – cd8 antigens
- MeSH D23.050.301.264.894.113 – cd13 antigens
- MeSH D23.050.301.264.894.118 – cd18 antigens
- MeSH D23.050.301.264.894.121 – lymphocyte activation gene 3 protein
- MeSH D23.050.301.264.894.123 – thy-1 antigens
- MeSH D23.050.301.264.894.127 – tumor necrosis factor receptor superfamily, member 7
- MeSH D23.050.301.264.894.128 – cd28 antigens
- MeSH D23.050.301.264.894.133 – cd69 antigens
- MeSH D23.050.301.264.894.156 – cd56 antigen
- MeSH D23.050.301.264.894.157 – cd57 antigens
- MeSH D23.050.301.264.894.158 – ctla-4 antigen
- MeSH D23.050.301.264.894.160 – dipeptidyl peptidase 4
- MeSH D23.050.301.264.894.580 – inducible t-cell co-stimulator protein
- MeSH D23.050.301.264.894.790 – programmed cell death 1 receptor
- MeSH D23.050.301.264.900 – antigens, differentiation, myelomonocytic
- MeSH D23.050.301.264.900.023 – cd68 molecule
- MeSH D23.050.301.264.900.045 – lipopolysaccharide receptors
- MeSH D23.050.301.264.900.050 – lewis x antigen
- MeSH D23.050.301.264.900.050.500 – sialyl lewis x antigen
- MeSH D23.050.301.264.900.131 – platelet endothelial cell adhesion molecule-1
- MeSH D23.050.301.264.900.565 – sialic acid binding ig-like lectin 3
- MeSH D23.050.301.264.920 – antigens, ly
- MeSH D23.050.301.264.920.500 – nk cell lectin-like receptor subfamily a
- MeSH D23.050.301.264.965 – stage-specific embryonic antigens
- MeSH D23.050.301.264.965.500 – lewis x antigen
- MeSH D23.050.301.264.965.500.500 – sialyl lewis x antigen
- MeSH D23.050.301.280 – arrestin
- MeSH D23.050.301.285 – b7 antigens
- MeSH D23.050.301.285.100 – b7-1 antigen
- MeSH D23.050.301.285.200 – b7-2 antigen
- MeSH D23.050.301.285.400 – b7-h1 antigen
- MeSH D23.050.301.285.500 – inducible t-cell co-stimulator ligand
- MeSH D23.050.301.285.800 – programmed cell death 1 ligand 2 protein
- MeSH D23.050.301.285.900 – v-set domain-containing t-cell activation inhibitor 1
- MeSH D23.050.301.290 – blood group antigens
- MeSH D23.050.301.290.031 – abo blood-group system
- MeSH D23.050.301.290.301 – duffy blood-group system
- MeSH D23.050.301.290.501 – i blood-group system
- MeSH D23.050.301.290.533 – kell blood-group system
- MeSH D23.050.301.290.538 – kidd blood-group system
- MeSH D23.050.301.290.544 – lewis blood group antigens
- MeSH D23.050.301.290.544.059 – lewis x antigen
- MeSH D23.050.301.290.544.059.500 – sialyl lewis x antigen
- MeSH D23.050.301.290.544.119 – ca-19-9 antigen
- MeSH D23.050.301.290.552 – lutheran blood-group system
- MeSH D23.050.301.290.606 – mnss blood-group system
- MeSH D23.050.301.290.691 – p blood-group system
- MeSH D23.050.301.290.775 – rh-hr blood-group system
- MeSH D23.050.301.350 – cell adhesion molecules
- MeSH D23.050.301.350.049 – 12e7 antigen
- MeSH D23.050.301.350.074 – cd11 antigens
- MeSH D23.050.301.350.074.024 – cd11a antigen
- MeSH D23.050.301.350.074.049 – cd11b antigen
- MeSH D23.050.301.350.074.074 – cd11c antigen
- MeSH D23.050.301.350.074.400 – lymphocyte function-associated antigen-1
- MeSH D23.050.301.350.098 – cd24 antigen
- MeSH D23.050.301.350.107 – ceacam1 protein
- MeSH D23.050.301.350.115 – cell adhesion molecule-1
- MeSH D23.050.301.350.123 – nectins
- MeSH D23.050.301.350.131 – platelet endothelial cell adhesion molecule-1
- MeSH D23.050.301.350.150 – cd146 antigen
- MeSH D23.050.301.350.154 – endolyn
- MeSH D23.050.301.350.200 – cadherins
- MeSH D23.050.301.350.200.500 – desmosomal cadherins
- MeSH D23.050.301.350.200.500.249 – desmocollins
- MeSH D23.050.301.350.200.500.500 – desmogleins
- MeSH D23.050.301.350.200.500.500.500 – desmoglein 1
- MeSH D23.050.301.350.200.500.500.625 – desmoglein 2
- MeSH D23.050.301.350.200.500.500.750 – desmoglein 3
- MeSH D23.050.301.350.200.750 – protocadherins
- MeSH D23.050.301.350.202 – dc-specific icam-3 grabbing nonintegrin
- MeSH D23.050.301.350.210 – carcinoembryonic antigen
- MeSH D23.050.301.350.230 – cd4 immunoadhesins
- MeSH D23.050.301.350.250 – cell adhesion molecules, neuronal
- MeSH D23.050.301.350.250.150 – cell adhesion molecules, neuron-glia
- MeSH D23.050.301.350.250.150.050 – activated-leukocyte cell adhesion molecule
- MeSH D23.050.301.350.250.325 – contactins
- MeSH D23.050.301.350.250.325.100 – contactin 1
- MeSH D23.050.301.350.250.325.200 – contactin 2
- MeSH D23.050.301.350.250.500 – myelin p0 protein
- MeSH D23.050.301.350.250.520 – neural cell adhesion molecules
- MeSH D23.050.301.350.250.520.156 – cd56 antigen
- MeSH D23.050.301.350.250.520.578 – neural cell adhesion molecule l1
- MeSH D23.050.301.350.250.520.789 – neurocan
- MeSH D23.050.301.350.250.520.894 – neuroligins
- MeSH D23.050.301.350.250.760 – neurexins
- MeSH D23.050.301.350.263 – epithelial cell adhesion molecule
- MeSH D23.050.301.350.275 – integrin alphaxbeta2
- MeSH D23.050.301.350.275.500 – cd11c antigen
- MeSH D23.050.301.350.275.750 – cd18 antigens
- MeSH D23.050.301.350.450 – intercellular adhesion molecule-1
- MeSH D23.050.301.350.494 – intercellular adhesion molecule-3
- MeSH D23.050.301.350.537 – junctional adhesion molecules
- MeSH D23.050.301.350.537.500 – coxsackie and adenovirus receptor-like membrane protein
- MeSH D23.050.301.350.537.750 – junctional adhesion molecule a
- MeSH D23.050.301.350.537.875 – junctional adhesion molecule b
- MeSH D23.050.301.350.537.937 – junctional adhesion molecule c
- MeSH D23.050.301.350.625 – receptors, lymphocyte homing
- MeSH D23.050.301.350.625.144 – hyaluronan receptors
- MeSH D23.050.301.350.625.347 – integrin alpha4beta1
- MeSH D23.050.301.350.625.550 – lymphocyte function-associated antigen-1
- MeSH D23.050.301.350.625.903 – l-selectin
- MeSH D23.050.301.350.663 – reelin protein
- MeSH D23.050.301.350.700 – selectins
- MeSH D23.050.301.350.700.300 – e-selectin
- MeSH D23.050.301.350.700.510 – l-selectin
- MeSH D23.050.301.350.700.775 – p-selectin
- MeSH D23.050.301.350.720 – sialic acid binding ig-like lectin 2
- MeSH D23.050.301.350.920 – vascular cell adhesion molecule-1
- MeSH D23.050.301.350.960 – vasodilator-stimulated phosphoprotein
- MeSH D23.050.301.500 – histocompatibility antigens
- MeSH D23.050.301.500.100 – histocompatibility antigens class i
- MeSH D23.050.301.500.100.175 – beta-2 microglobulin
- MeSH D23.050.301.500.100.350 – h-2 antigens
- MeSH D23.050.301.500.100.363 – hemochromatosis protein
- MeSH D23.050.301.500.100.375 – histocompatibility antigen h-2d
- MeSH D23.050.301.500.100.400 – hla-a antigens
- MeSH D23.050.301.500.100.400.010 – hla-a1 antigen
- MeSH D23.050.301.500.100.400.020 – hla-a2 antigen
- MeSH D23.050.301.500.100.400.030 – hla-a3 antigen
- MeSH D23.050.301.500.100.400.110 – hla-a11 antigen
- MeSH D23.050.301.500.100.400.240 – hla-a24 antigen
- MeSH D23.050.301.500.100.500 – hla-b antigens
- MeSH D23.050.301.500.100.500.070 – hla-b7 antigen
- MeSH D23.050.301.500.100.500.080 – hla-b8 antigen
- MeSH D23.050.301.500.100.500.130 – hla-b13 antigen
- MeSH D23.050.301.500.100.500.140 – hla-b14 antigen
- MeSH D23.050.301.500.100.500.150 – hla-b15 antigen
- MeSH D23.050.301.500.100.500.180 – hla-b18 antigen
- MeSH D23.050.301.500.100.500.270 – hla-b27 antigen
- MeSH D23.050.301.500.100.500.350 – hla-b35 antigen
- MeSH D23.050.301.500.100.500.370 – hla-b37 antigen
- MeSH D23.050.301.500.100.500.380 – hla-b38 antigen
- MeSH D23.050.301.500.100.500.390 – hla-b39 antigen
- MeSH D23.050.301.500.100.500.400 – hla-b40 antigen
- MeSH D23.050.301.500.100.500.440 – hla-b44 antigen
- MeSH D23.050.301.500.100.500.510 – hla-b51 antigen
- MeSH D23.050.301.500.100.500.520 – hla-b52 antigen
- MeSH D23.050.301.500.100.600 – hla-c antigens
- MeSH D23.050.301.500.100.700 – hla-g antigens
- MeSH D23.050.301.500.100.850 – hla-e antigens
- MeSH D23.050.301.500.400 – histocompatibility antigens class ii
- MeSH D23.050.301.500.400.199 – h-2 antigens
- MeSH D23.050.301.500.400.400 – hla-d antigens
- MeSH D23.050.301.500.400.400.420 – hla-dp antigens
- MeSH D23.050.301.500.400.400.420.500 – hla-dp alpha-chains
- MeSH D23.050.301.500.400.400.420.750 – hla-dp beta-chains
- MeSH D23.050.301.500.400.400.430 – hla-dq antigens
- MeSH D23.050.301.500.400.400.430.500 – hla-dq alpha-chains
- MeSH D23.050.301.500.400.400.430.750 – hla-dq beta-chains
- MeSH D23.050.301.500.400.400.440 – hla-dr antigens
- MeSH D23.050.301.500.400.400.440.100 – hla-dr alpha-chains
- MeSH D23.050.301.500.400.400.440.200 – hla-dr beta-chains
- MeSH D23.050.301.500.400.400.440.200.010 – hla-drb1 chains
- MeSH D23.050.301.500.400.400.440.200.030 – hla-drb3 chains
- MeSH D23.050.301.500.400.400.440.200.040 – hla-drb4 chains
- MeSH D23.050.301.500.400.400.440.200.050 – hla-drb5 chains
- MeSH D23.050.301.500.400.400.440.400 – hla-dr serological subtypes
- MeSH D23.050.301.500.400.400.440.400.010 – hla-dr1 antigen
- MeSH D23.050.301.500.400.400.440.400.020 – hla-dr2 antigen
- MeSH D23.050.301.500.400.400.440.400.030 – hla-dr3 antigen
- MeSH D23.050.301.500.400.400.440.400.040 – hla-dr4 antigen
- MeSH D23.050.301.500.400.400.440.400.050 – hla-dr5 antigen
- MeSH D23.050.301.500.400.400.440.400.060 – hla-dr6 antigen
- MeSH D23.050.301.500.400.400.440.400.070 – hla-dr7 antigen
- MeSH D23.050.301.500.450 – hla antigens
- MeSH D23.050.301.500.450.370 – hla-a antigens
- MeSH D23.050.301.500.450.370.010 – hla-a1 antigen
- MeSH D23.050.301.500.450.370.020 – hla-a2 antigen
- MeSH D23.050.301.500.450.370.030 – hla-a3 antigen
- MeSH D23.050.301.500.450.370.110 – hla-a11 antigen
- MeSH D23.050.301.500.450.370.240 – hla-a24 antigen
- MeSH D23.050.301.500.450.380 – hla-b antigens
- MeSH D23.050.301.500.450.380.070 – hla-b7 antigen
- MeSH D23.050.301.500.450.380.080 – hla-b8 antigen
- MeSH D23.050.301.500.450.380.130 – hla-b13 antigen
- MeSH D23.050.301.500.450.380.140 – hla-b14 antigen
- MeSH D23.050.301.500.450.380.150 – hla-b15 antigen
- MeSH D23.050.301.500.450.380.180 – hla-b18 antigen
- MeSH D23.050.301.500.450.380.270 – hla-b27 antigen
- MeSH D23.050.301.500.450.380.350 – hla-b35 antigen
- MeSH D23.050.301.500.450.380.370 – hla-b37 antigen
- MeSH D23.050.301.500.450.380.380 – hla-b38 antigen
- MeSH D23.050.301.500.450.380.390 – hla-b39 antigen
- MeSH D23.050.301.500.450.380.400 – hla-b40 antigen
- MeSH D23.050.301.500.450.380.440 – hla-b44 antigen
- MeSH D23.050.301.500.450.380.510 – hla-b51 antigen
- MeSH D23.050.301.500.450.380.520 – hla-b52 antigen
- MeSH D23.050.301.500.450.390 – hla-c antigens
- MeSH D23.050.301.500.450.400 – hla-d antigens
- MeSH D23.050.301.500.450.400.420 – hla-dp antigens
- MeSH D23.050.301.500.450.400.420.500 – hla-dp alpha-chains
- MeSH D23.050.301.500.450.400.420.750 – hla-dp beta-chains
- MeSH D23.050.301.500.450.400.430 – hla-dq antigens
- MeSH D23.050.301.500.450.400.430.500 – hla-dq alpha-chains
- MeSH D23.050.301.500.450.400.430.750 – hla-dq beta-chains
- MeSH D23.050.301.500.450.400.440 – hla-dr antigens
- MeSH D23.050.301.500.450.400.440.222 – hla-dr alpha-chains
- MeSH D23.050.301.500.450.400.440.333 – hla-dr beta-chains
- MeSH D23.050.301.500.450.400.440.333.500 – hla-drb1 chains
- MeSH D23.050.301.500.450.400.440.333.750 – hla-drb3 chains
- MeSH D23.050.301.500.450.400.440.333.875 – hla-drb4 chains
- MeSH D23.050.301.500.450.400.440.333.937 – hla-drb5 chains
- MeSH D23.050.301.500.450.400.440.389 – hla-dr serological subtypes
- MeSH D23.050.301.500.450.400.440.389.500 – hla-dr1 antigen
- MeSH D23.050.301.500.450.400.440.389.750 – hla-dr2 antigen
- MeSH D23.050.301.500.450.400.440.389.875 – hla-dr3 antigen
- MeSH D23.050.301.500.450.400.440.389.937 – hla-dr4 antigen
- MeSH D23.050.301.500.450.400.440.389.968 – hla-dr5 antigen
- MeSH D23.050.301.500.450.400.440.389.984 – hla-dr6 antigen
- MeSH D23.050.301.500.450.400.440.389.992 – hla-dr7 antigen
- MeSH D23.050.301.500.450.700 – hla-g antigens
- MeSH D23.050.301.500.600 – minor histocompatibility antigens
- MeSH D23.050.301.500.600.200 – antigens, cd19
- MeSH D23.050.301.500.600.300 – cathepsin h
- MeSH D23.050.301.500.600.350 – focal adhesion kinase 2
- MeSH D23.050.301.500.600.400 – h-y antigen
- MeSH D23.050.301.500.600.700 – erb-b2 receptor tyrosine kinases
- MeSH D23.050.301.500.600.775 – receptors, purinergic p2x5
- MeSH D23.050.301.500.600.813 – reduced folate carrier protein
- MeSH D23.050.301.500.600.850 – rho guanine nucleotide dissociation inhibitor beta
- MeSH D23.050.301.500.600.925 – thymidine phosphorylase
- MeSH D23.050.301.500.600.962 – wnk lysine-deficient protein kinase 1
- MeSH D23.050.301.562 – leukocyte l1 antigen complex
- MeSH D23.050.301.562.100 – calgranulin a
- MeSH D23.050.301.562.200 – calgranulin b
- MeSH D23.050.301.593 – lymphocyte antigen 96
- MeSH D23.050.301.609 – mesothelin
- MeSH D23.050.301.625 – minor lymphocyte stimulatory antigens
- MeSH D23.050.301.900 – variant surface glycoproteins, trypanosoma

==== MeSH D23.050.327 – antigens, viral ====
- MeSH D23.050.327.045 – adenovirus early proteins
- MeSH D23.050.327.045.050 – adenovirus e1 proteins
- MeSH D23.050.327.045.060 – adenovirus e2 proteins
- MeSH D23.050.327.045.070 – adenovirus e3 proteins
- MeSH D23.050.327.045.080 – adenovirus e4 proteins
- MeSH D23.050.327.062 – antigens, viral, tumor
- MeSH D23.050.327.062.045 – adenovirus e1a proteins
- MeSH D23.050.327.062.050 – adenovirus e1b proteins
- MeSH D23.050.327.062.090 – antigens, polyomavirus transforming
- MeSH D23.050.327.150 – deltaretrovirus antigens
- MeSH D23.050.327.150.500 – htlv-i antigens
- MeSH D23.050.327.150.510 – htlv-ii antigens
- MeSH D23.050.327.300 – epstein-barr virus nuclear antigens
- MeSH D23.050.327.461 – hemagglutinins, viral
- MeSH D23.050.327.461.350 – hn protein
- MeSH D23.050.327.495 – hepatitis antigens
- MeSH D23.050.327.495.249 – hepatitis a antigens
- MeSH D23.050.327.495.500 – hepatitis b antigens
- MeSH D23.050.327.495.500.450 – hepatitis b core antigens
- MeSH D23.050.327.495.500.469 – hepatitis b e antigens
- MeSH D23.050.327.495.500.475 – hepatitis b surface antigens
- MeSH D23.050.327.495.505 – hepatitis c antigens
- MeSH D23.050.327.495.752 – hepatitis delta antigens
- MeSH D23.050.327.520 – hiv antigens
- MeSH D23.050.327.520.300 – hiv core protein p24
- MeSH D23.050.327.520.330 – hiv envelope protein gp41
- MeSH D23.050.327.520.330.500 – enfuvirtide
- MeSH D23.050.327.520.350 – hiv envelope protein gp120

==== MeSH D23.050.422 – autoantigens ====
- MeSH D23.050.422.031 – centromere protein a
- MeSH D23.050.422.061 – centromere protein b
- MeSH D23.050.422.093 – collagen type xvii
- MeSH D23.050.422.124 – desmoglein 1
- MeSH D23.050.422.249 – desmoglein 3
- MeSH D23.050.422.500 – heymann nephritis antigenic complex
- MeSH D23.050.422.500.500 – low density lipoprotein receptor-related protein-2
- MeSH D23.050.422.500.750 – ldl-receptor related protein-associated protein
- MeSH D23.050.422.625 – myelin-oligodendrocyte glycoprotein
- MeSH D23.050.422.688 – ss-a antigen
- MeSH D23.050.422.689 – trim21 protein
- MeSH D23.050.422.750 – snrnp core proteins
- MeSH D23.050.422.875 – ss-b antigen

==== MeSH D23.050.550 – epitopes ====
- MeSH D23.050.550.325 – antigens, tumor-associated, carbohydrate
- MeSH D23.050.550.325.050 – lewis x antigen
- MeSH D23.050.550.325.050.500 – sialyl lewis x antigen
- MeSH D23.050.550.325.119 – ca-19-9 antigen
- MeSH D23.050.550.325.225 – ca-125 antigen
- MeSH D23.050.550.325.300 – mucin-1
- MeSH D23.050.550.395 – epitopes, b-lymphocyte
- MeSH D23.050.550.402 – epitopes, t-lymphocyte
- MeSH D23.050.550.480 – haptens
- MeSH D23.050.550.480.097 – p-azobenzenearsonate
- MeSH D23.050.550.480.330 – cardiolipins
- MeSH D23.050.550.480.350 – dinitrochlorobenzene
- MeSH D23.050.550.480.641 – nitrohydroxyiodophenylacetate
- MeSH D23.050.550.480.820 – picryl chloride
- MeSH D23.050.550.500 – immunodominant epitopes
- MeSH D23.050.550.750 – immunoglobulin idiotypes

==== MeSH D23.050.705 – isoantigens ====
- MeSH D23.050.705.115 – antigens, human platelet
- MeSH D23.050.705.230 – blood group antigens
- MeSH D23.050.705.230.031 – abo blood-group system
- MeSH D23.050.705.230.301 – duffy blood-group system
- MeSH D23.050.705.230.501 – i blood-group system
- MeSH D23.050.705.230.533 – kell blood-group system
- MeSH D23.050.705.230.538 – kidd blood-group system
- MeSH D23.050.705.230.544 – lewis blood group antigens
- MeSH D23.050.705.230.544.059 – lewis x antigen
- MeSH D23.050.705.230.544.059.500 – sialyl lewis x antigen
- MeSH D23.050.705.230.544.119 – ca-19-9 antigen
- MeSH D23.050.705.230.552 – lutheran blood-group system
- MeSH D23.050.705.230.606 – mnss blood-group system
- MeSH D23.050.705.230.691 – p blood-group system
- MeSH D23.050.705.230.775 – rh-hr blood-group system
- MeSH D23.050.705.552 – histocompatibility antigens
- MeSH D23.050.705.552.100 – histocompatibility antigens class i
- MeSH D23.050.705.552.100.175 – beta-2 microglobulin
- MeSH D23.050.705.552.100.350 – h-2 antigens
- MeSH D23.050.705.552.100.375 – hemochromatosis protein
- MeSH D23.050.705.552.100.400 – hla-a antigens
- MeSH D23.050.705.552.100.400.010 – hla-a1 antigen
- MeSH D23.050.705.552.100.400.020 – hla-a2 antigen
- MeSH D23.050.705.552.100.400.030 – hla-a3 antigen
- MeSH D23.050.705.552.100.400.110 – hla-a11 antigen
- MeSH D23.050.705.552.100.400.240 – hla-a24 antigen
- MeSH D23.050.705.552.100.500 – hla-b antigens
- MeSH D23.050.705.552.100.500.070 – hla-b7 antigen
- MeSH D23.050.705.552.100.500.080 – hla-b8 antigen
- MeSH D23.050.705.552.100.500.130 – hla-b13 antigen
- MeSH D23.050.705.552.100.500.140 – hla-b14 antigen
- MeSH D23.050.705.552.100.500.150 – hla-b15 antigen
- MeSH D23.050.705.552.100.500.180 – hla-b18 antigen
- MeSH D23.050.705.552.100.500.270 – hla-b27 antigen
- MeSH D23.050.705.552.100.500.350 – hla-b35 antigen
- MeSH D23.050.705.552.100.500.370 – hla-b37 antigen
- MeSH D23.050.705.552.100.500.380 – hla-b38 antigen
- MeSH D23.050.705.552.100.500.390 – hla-b39 antigen
- MeSH D23.050.705.552.100.500.400 – hla-b40 antigen
- MeSH D23.050.705.552.100.500.440 – hla-b44 antigen
- MeSH D23.050.705.552.100.500.510 – hla-b51 antigen
- MeSH D23.050.705.552.100.500.520 – hla-b52 antigen
- MeSH D23.050.705.552.100.600 – hla-c antigens
- MeSH D23.050.705.552.100.700 – hla-g antigens
- MeSH D23.050.705.552.100.850 – hla-e antigens
- MeSH D23.050.705.552.410 – histocompatibility antigens class ii
- MeSH D23.050.705.552.410.199 – h-2 antigens
- MeSH D23.050.705.552.410.400 – hla-d antigens
- MeSH D23.050.705.552.410.400.420 – hla-dp antigens
- MeSH D23.050.705.552.410.400.420.500 – hla-dp alpha-chains
- MeSH D23.050.705.552.410.400.420.750 – hla-dp beta-chains
- MeSH D23.050.705.552.410.400.430 – hla-dq antigens
- MeSH D23.050.705.552.410.400.430.500 – hla-dq alpha-chains
- MeSH D23.050.705.552.410.400.430.750 – hla-dq beta-chains
- MeSH D23.050.705.552.410.400.440 – hla-dr antigens
- MeSH D23.050.705.552.410.400.440.100 – hla-dr alpha-chains
- MeSH D23.050.705.552.410.400.440.200 – hla-dr beta-chains
- MeSH D23.050.705.552.410.400.440.200.010 – hla-drb1 chains
- MeSH D23.050.705.552.410.400.440.200.030 – hla-drb3 chains
- MeSH D23.050.705.552.410.400.440.200.040 – hla-drb4 chains
- MeSH D23.050.705.552.410.400.440.200.050 – hla-drb5 chains
- MeSH D23.050.705.552.410.400.440.389 – hla-dr serological subtypes
- MeSH D23.050.705.552.410.400.440.389.010 – hla-dr1 antigen
- MeSH D23.050.705.552.410.400.440.389.020 – hla-dr2 antigen
- MeSH D23.050.705.552.410.400.440.389.030 – hla-dr3 antigen
- MeSH D23.050.705.552.410.400.440.389.040 – hla-dr4 antigen
- MeSH D23.050.705.552.410.400.440.389.050 – hla-dr5 antigen
- MeSH D23.050.705.552.410.400.440.389.060 – hla-dr6 antigen
- MeSH D23.050.705.552.410.400.440.389.070 – hla-dr7 antigen
- MeSH D23.050.705.552.450 – hla antigens
- MeSH D23.050.705.552.450.370 – hla-a antigens
- MeSH D23.050.705.552.450.370.372 – hla-a1 antigen
- MeSH D23.050.705.552.450.370.374 – hla-a2 antigen
- MeSH D23.050.705.552.450.370.376 – hla-a3 antigen
- MeSH D23.050.705.552.450.370.500 – hla-a11 antigen
- MeSH D23.050.705.552.450.370.600 – hla-a24 antigen
- MeSH D23.050.705.552.450.380 – hla-b antigens
- MeSH D23.050.705.552.450.380.070 – hla-b7 antigen
- MeSH D23.050.705.552.450.380.080 – hla-b8 antigen
- MeSH D23.050.705.552.450.380.130 – hla-b13 antigen
- MeSH D23.050.705.552.450.380.140 – hla-b14 antigen
- MeSH D23.050.705.552.450.380.150 – hla-b15 antigen
- MeSH D23.050.705.552.450.380.180 – hla-b18 antigen
- MeSH D23.050.705.552.450.380.270 – hla-b27 antigen
- MeSH D23.050.705.552.450.380.350 – hla-b35 antigen
- MeSH D23.050.705.552.450.380.370 – hla-b37 antigen
- MeSH D23.050.705.552.450.380.380 – hla-b38 antigen
- MeSH D23.050.705.552.450.380.390 – hla-b39 antigen
- MeSH D23.050.705.552.450.380.400 – hla-b40 antigen
- MeSH D23.050.705.552.450.380.440 – hla-b44 antigen
- MeSH D23.050.705.552.450.380.510 – hla-b51 antigen
- MeSH D23.050.705.552.450.380.520 – hla-b52 antigen
- MeSH D23.050.705.552.450.390 – hla-c antigens
- MeSH D23.050.705.552.450.400 – hla-d antigens
- MeSH D23.050.705.552.450.400.420 – hla-dp antigens
- MeSH D23.050.705.552.450.400.420.500 – hla-dp alpha-chains
- MeSH D23.050.705.552.450.400.420.750 – hla-dp beta-chains
- MeSH D23.050.705.552.450.400.430 – hla-dq antigens
- MeSH D23.050.705.552.450.400.430.500 – hla-dq alpha-chains
- MeSH D23.050.705.552.450.400.430.750 – hla-dq beta-chains
- MeSH D23.050.705.552.450.400.440 – hla-dr antigens
- MeSH D23.050.705.552.450.400.440.222 – hla-dr alpha-chains
- MeSH D23.050.705.552.450.400.440.333 – hla-dr beta-chains
- MeSH D23.050.705.552.450.400.440.333.500 – hla-drb1 chains
- MeSH D23.050.705.552.450.400.440.333.750 – hla-drb3 chains
- MeSH D23.050.705.552.450.400.440.333.875 – hla-drb4 chains
- MeSH D23.050.705.552.450.400.440.333.937 – hla-drb5 chains
- MeSH D23.050.705.552.450.400.440.389 – hla-dr serological subtypes
- MeSH D23.050.705.552.450.400.440.389.500 – hla-dr1 antigen
- MeSH D23.050.705.552.450.400.440.389.750 – hla-dr2 antigen
- MeSH D23.050.705.552.450.400.440.389.875 – hla-dr3 antigen
- MeSH D23.050.705.552.450.400.440.389.937 – hla-dr4 antigen
- MeSH D23.050.705.552.450.400.440.389.968 – hla-dr5 antigen
- MeSH D23.050.705.552.450.400.440.389.984 – hla-dr6 antigen
- MeSH D23.050.705.552.450.400.440.389.992 – hla-dr7 antigen
- MeSH D23.050.705.552.450.400.440.389.500 – hla-dr1 antigen
- MeSH D23.050.705.552.450.400.440.389.750 – hla-dr2 antigen
- MeSH D23.050.705.552.450.400.440.389.875 – hla-dr3 antigen
- MeSH D23.050.705.552.450.400.440.389.937 – hla-dr4 antigen
- MeSH D23.050.705.552.450.400.440.389.968 – hla-dr5 antigen
- MeSH D23.050.705.552.450.400.440.389.984 – hla-dr6 antigen
- MeSH D23.050.705.552.450.400.440.389.992 – hla-dr7 antigen
- MeSH D23.050.705.552.450.700 – hla-g antigens
- MeSH D23.050.705.552.600 – minor histocompatibility antigens
- MeSH D23.050.705.552.600.200 – antigens, cd19
- MeSH D23.050.705.552.600.300 – cathepsin h
- MeSH D23.050.705.552.600.350 – focal adhesion kinase 2
- MeSH D23.050.705.552.600.400 – h-y antigen
- MeSH D23.050.705.552.600.550 – erb-b2 receptor tyrosine kinases
- MeSH D23.050.705.552.600.625 – receptors, purinergic p2x5
- MeSH D23.050.705.552.600.663 – reduced folate carrier protein
- MeSH D23.050.705.552.600.700 – rho guanine nucleotide dissociation inhibitor beta
- MeSH D23.050.705.552.600.850 – thymidine phosphorylase
- MeSH D23.050.705.552.600.925 – wnk lysine-deficient protein kinase 1

==== MeSH D23.050.820 – superantigens ====
- MeSH D23.050.820.625 – minor lymphocyte stimulatory antigens

==== MeSH D23.050.865 – vaccines, synthetic ====
- MeSH D23.050.865.450 – nucleic acid-based vaccines
- MeSH D23.050.865.450.250 – vaccines, dna
- MeSH D23.050.865.450.500 – mrna vaccines
- MeSH D23.050.865.450.500.500 – 2019-ncov vaccine mrna-1273
- MeSH D23.050.865.450.500.750 – bnt162 vaccine
- MeSH D23.050.865.450.500.875 – bnt162b5
- MeSH D23.050.865.900 – vaccines, conjugate
- MeSH D23.050.865.915 – vaccines, edible
- MeSH D23.050.865.940 – vaccines, virosome
- MeSH D23.050.865.955 – vaccines, virus-like particle

=== MeSH D23.101 – biomarkers ===
==== MeSH D23.101.100 – antigens, differentiation ====
- MeSH D23.101.100.110 – antigens, cd
- MeSH D23.101.100.110.100 – antigens, cd1
- MeSH D23.101.100.110.100.500 – antigens, cd1d
- MeSH D23.101.100.110.119 – antigens, cd19
- MeSH D23.101.100.110.120 – antigens, cd20
- MeSH D23.101.100.110.134 – antigens, cd34
- MeSH D23.101.100.110.351 – cd163 antigen
- MeSH D23.101.100.110.567 – cd68 molecule
- MeSH D23.101.100.110.783 – cd83 antigen
- MeSH D23.101.100.150 – antigens, differentiation, b-lymphocyte
- MeSH D23.101.100.150.101 – cd5 antigens
- MeSH D23.101.100.150.119 – antigens, cd19
- MeSH D23.101.100.150.120 – antigens, cd20
- MeSH D23.101.100.150.140 – cd40 antigens
- MeSH D23.101.100.894 – antigens, differentiation, t-lymphocyte
- MeSH D23.101.100.894.080 – antigens, cd1
- MeSH D23.101.100.894.080.500 – antigens, cd1d
- MeSH D23.101.100.894.090 – cd2 antigens
- MeSH D23.101.100.894.093 – t lineage-specific activation antigen 1
- MeSH D23.101.100.894.095 – cd3 complex
- MeSH D23.101.100.894.095.800 – receptor-cd3 complex, antigen, t-cell
- MeSH D23.101.100.894.100 – cd4 antigens
- MeSH D23.101.100.894.101 – cd5 antigens
- MeSH D23.101.100.894.107 – antigens, cd7
- MeSH D23.101.100.894.108 – cd8 antigens
- MeSH D23.101.100.894.113 – cd13 antigens
- MeSH D23.101.100.894.118 – cd18 antigens
- MeSH D23.101.100.894.121 – lymphocyte activation gene 3 protein
- MeSH D23.101.100.894.123 – thy-1 antigens
- MeSH D23.101.100.894.127 – tumor necrosis factor receptor superfamily, member 7
- MeSH D23.101.100.894.128 – cd28 antigens
- MeSH D23.101.100.894.133 – cd69 antigens
- MeSH D23.101.100.894.156 – cd56 antigen
- MeSH D23.101.100.894.157 – cd57 antigens
- MeSH D23.101.100.894.158 – ctla-4 antigen
- MeSH D23.101.100.894.160 – dipeptidyl peptidase 4
- MeSH D23.101.100.894.580 – inducible t-cell co-stimulator protein
- MeSH D23.101.100.894.790 – programmed cell death 1 receptor
- MeSH D23.101.100.900 – antigens, differentiation, myelomonocytic
- MeSH D23.101.100.900.023 – cd68 molecule
- MeSH D23.101.100.900.045 – lipopolysaccharide receptors
- MeSH D23.101.100.900.050 – lewis x antigen
- MeSH D23.101.100.900.050.500 – sialyl lewis x antigen
- MeSH D23.101.100.900.131 – platelet endothelial cell adhesion molecule-1
- MeSH D23.101.100.900.565 – sialic acid binding ig-like lectin 3
- MeSH D23.101.100.920 – antigens, ly
- MeSH D23.101.100.920.500 – nk cell lectin-like receptor subfamily a
- MeSH D23.101.100.943 – cd52 antigen
- MeSH D23.101.100.965 – stage-specific embryonic antigens

==== MeSH D23.101.140 – biomarkers, tumor ====
- MeSH D23.101.140.050 – alpha-fetoproteins
- MeSH D23.101.140.055 – ki-1 antigen
- MeSH D23.101.140.075 – antigens, tumor-associated, carbohydrate
- MeSH D23.101.140.075.050 – lewis x antigen
- MeSH D23.101.140.075.050.500 – sialyl lewis x antigen
- MeSH D23.101.140.075.119 – ca-19-9 antigen
- MeSH D23.101.140.075.225 – ca-125 antigen
- MeSH D23.101.140.075.300 – mucin-1
- MeSH D23.101.140.300 – carcinoembryonic antigen
- MeSH D23.101.140.325 – chorionic gonadotropin, beta subunit, human
- MeSH D23.101.140.375 – hormones, ectopic
- MeSH D23.101.140.400 – ki-67 antigen
- MeSH D23.101.140.425 – mammaglobin a
- MeSH D23.101.140.450 – nephroblastoma overexpressed protein
- MeSH D23.101.140.500 – neprilysin
- MeSH D23.101.140.540 – normetanephrine
- MeSH D23.101.140.600 – proliferating cell nuclear antigen
- MeSH D23.101.140.625 – prostate-specific antigen
- MeSH D23.101.140.642 – erb-b2 receptor tyrosine kinases
- MeSH D23.101.140.721 – receptor, erbb-3
- MeSH D23.101.140.760 – receptor, erbb-4
- MeSH D23.101.140.780 – pancreatitis-associated proteins
- MeSH D23.101.140.800 – synaptophysin
- MeSH D23.101.140.870 – tissue kallikreins
- MeSH D23.101.140.880 – tissue polypeptide antigen

=== MeSH D23.119 – blood coagulation factors ===
==== MeSH D23.119.300 – factor v ====
- MeSH D23.119.300.300 – factor va

==== MeSH D23.119.325 – factor vii ====
- MeSH D23.119.325.300 – factor viia

==== MeSH D23.119.350 – factor viii ====
- MeSH D23.119.350.300 – factor viiia

==== MeSH D23.119.375 – factor ix ====
- MeSH D23.119.375.310 – factor ixa

==== MeSH D23.119.400 – factor x ====
- MeSH D23.119.400.315 – factor xa

==== MeSH D23.119.425 – factor xi ====
- MeSH D23.119.425.320 – factor xia

==== MeSH D23.119.450 – factor xii ====
- MeSH D23.119.450.324 – factor xiia

==== MeSH D23.119.475 – factor xiii ====
- MeSH D23.119.475.500 – factor xiiia

==== MeSH D23.119.490 – fibrinogen ====
- MeSH D23.119.490.265 – fibrinogens, abnormal

==== MeSH D23.119.597 – kallikreins ====
- MeSH D23.119.597.712 – prekallikrein

==== MeSH D23.119.630 – kininogens ====
- MeSH D23.119.630.480 – kininogen, high-molecular-weight
- MeSH D23.119.630.490 – kininogen, low-molecular-weight

==== MeSH D23.119.832 – plasminogen inactivators ====
- MeSH D23.119.832.500 – plasminogen activator inhibitor 1
- MeSH D23.119.832.750 – plasminogen activator inhibitor 2

=== MeSH D23.125 – chemotactic factors ===
==== MeSH D23.125.300 – chemokines ====
- MeSH D23.125.300.070 – beta-thromboglobulin
- MeSH D23.125.300.100 – chemokines, c
- MeSH D23.125.300.110 – chemokines, cc
- MeSH D23.125.300.110.050 – chemokine ccl1
- MeSH D23.125.300.110.100 – chemokine ccl18
- MeSH D23.125.300.110.125 – chemokine ccl26
- MeSH D23.125.300.110.150 – chemokine ccl3
- MeSH D23.125.300.110.200 – chemokine ccl4
- MeSH D23.125.300.110.250 – chemokine ccl5
- MeSH D23.125.300.110.550 – chemokine ccl11
- MeSH D23.125.300.110.850 – chemokine ccl17
- MeSH D23.125.300.110.870 – chemokine ccl19
- MeSH D23.125.300.110.880 – chemokine ccl20
- MeSH D23.125.300.110.890 – chemokine ccl21
- MeSH D23.125.300.110.900 – chemokine ccl22
- MeSH D23.125.300.110.910 – chemokine ccl24
- MeSH D23.125.300.110.930 – chemokine ccl27
- MeSH D23.125.300.110.990 – monocyte chemoattractant proteins
- MeSH D23.125.300.110.990.600 – chemokine ccl2
- MeSH D23.125.300.110.990.800 – chemokine ccl7
- MeSH D23.125.300.110.990.900 – chemokine ccl8
- MeSH D23.125.300.120 – chemokines, cxc
- MeSH D23.125.300.120.050 – chemokine cxcl1
- MeSH D23.125.300.120.075 – chemokine cxcl16
- MeSH D23.125.300.120.100 – chemokine cxcl2
- MeSH D23.125.300.120.250 – chemokine cxcl5
- MeSH D23.125.300.120.300 – chemokine cxcl6
- MeSH D23.125.300.120.450 – chemokine cxcl9
- MeSH D23.125.300.120.500 – chemokine cxcl10
- MeSH D23.125.300.120.550 – chemokine cxcl11
- MeSH D23.125.300.120.600 – chemokine cxcl12
- MeSH D23.125.300.120.650 – chemokine cxcl13
- MeSH D23.125.300.120.800 – interleukin-8
- MeSH D23.125.300.120.900 – platelet factor 4
- MeSH D23.125.300.130 – chemokines, cx3c
- MeSH D23.125.300.130.500 – chemokine cx3cl1
- MeSH D23.125.300.600 – macrophage inflammatory proteins
- MeSH D23.125.300.600.250 – chemokine ccl18
- MeSH D23.125.300.600.500 – chemokine ccl3
- MeSH D23.125.300.600.750 – chemokine ccl4
- MeSH D23.125.300.600.870 – chemokine ccl19
- MeSH D23.125.300.600.880 – chemokine ccl20
- MeSH D23.125.300.600.940 – chemokine cxcl2

==== MeSH D23.125.477 – leukocyte migration-inhibitory factors ====
- MeSH D23.125.477.500 – macrophage migration-inhibitory factors

==== MeSH D23.125.842 – netrins ====
- MeSH D23.125.842.500 – netrin-1

=== MeSH D23.469 – inflammation mediators ===
==== MeSH D23.469.050 – autacoids ====
- MeSH D23.469.050.050 – angiotensins
- MeSH D23.469.050.050.025 – angiotensin i
- MeSH D23.469.050.050.050 – angiotensin ii
- MeSH D23.469.050.050.050.050 – angiotensin amide
- MeSH D23.469.050.050.050.700 – saralasin
- MeSH D23.469.050.050.050.725 – 1-sarcosine-8-isoleucine angiotensin ii
- MeSH D23.469.050.050.075 – angiotensin iii
- MeSH D23.469.050.175 – eicosanoids
- MeSH D23.469.050.175.450 – leukotrienes
- MeSH D23.469.050.175.450.400 – leukotriene a4
- MeSH D23.469.050.175.450.415 – leukotriene b4
- MeSH D23.469.050.175.450.725 – srs-a
- MeSH D23.469.050.175.450.725.400 – leukotriene c4
- MeSH D23.469.050.175.450.725.415 – leukotriene d4
- MeSH D23.469.050.175.450.725.425 – leukotriene e4
- MeSH D23.469.050.175.725 – prostaglandins
- MeSH D23.469.050.175.725.025 – prostaglandin endoperoxides
- MeSH D23.469.050.175.725.025.600 – prostaglandins g
- MeSH D23.469.050.175.725.025.650 – prostaglandins h
- MeSH D23.469.050.175.725.025.650.500 – prostaglandin h2
- MeSH D23.469.050.175.725.025.650.500.500 – 15-hydroxy-11 alpha,9 alpha-(epoxymethano)prosta-5,13-dienoic acid
- MeSH D23.469.050.175.725.100 – prostaglandins a
- MeSH D23.469.050.175.725.150 – prostaglandins b
- MeSH D23.469.050.175.725.200 – prostaglandins d
- MeSH D23.469.050.175.725.200.200 – prostaglandin d2
- MeSH D23.469.050.175.725.250 – prostaglandins e
- MeSH D23.469.050.175.725.250.100 – alprostadil
- MeSH D23.469.050.175.725.250.200 – dinoprostone
- MeSH D23.469.050.175.725.400 – prostaglandins f
- MeSH D23.469.050.175.725.400.200 – dinoprost
- MeSH D23.469.050.175.725.400.350 – 6-ketoprostaglandin f1 alpha
- MeSH D23.469.050.175.725.550 – prostaglandins i
- MeSH D23.469.050.175.725.550.500 – epoprostenol
- MeSH D23.469.050.175.725.775 – prostaglandins, synthetic
- MeSH D23.469.050.175.725.775.125 – iloprost
- MeSH D23.469.050.175.725.775.250 – prostaglandin endoperoxides, synthetic
- MeSH D23.469.050.175.725.775.350 – prostaglandins a, synthetic
- MeSH D23.469.050.175.725.775.450 – prostaglandins e, synthetic
- MeSH D23.469.050.175.725.775.450.050 – arbaprostil
- MeSH D23.469.050.175.725.775.450.300 – 16,16-dimethylprostaglandin e2
- MeSH D23.469.050.175.725.775.450.350 – enprostil
- MeSH D23.469.050.175.725.775.450.500 – misoprostol
- MeSH D23.469.050.175.725.775.450.750 – rioprostil
- MeSH D23.469.050.175.725.775.500 – prostaglandins f, synthetic
- MeSH D23.469.050.175.725.775.500.150 – carboprost
- MeSH D23.469.050.175.725.775.500.175 – cloprostenol
- MeSH D23.469.050.175.725.775.500.175.250 – bimatoprost
- MeSH D23.469.050.175.725.775.500.175.500 – travoprost
- MeSH D23.469.050.175.725.775.500.587 – latanoprost
- MeSH D23.469.050.300 – histamine
- MeSH D23.469.050.375 – kinins
- MeSH D23.469.050.375.110 – bradykinin
- MeSH D23.469.050.375.110.400 – kallidin
- MeSH D23.469.050.375.425 – kininogens
- MeSH D23.469.050.375.425.350 – kininogen, high-molecular-weight
- MeSH D23.469.050.375.425.400 – kininogen, low-molecular-weight
- MeSH D23.469.050.375.850 – tachykinins
- MeSH D23.469.050.375.850.275 – eledoisin
- MeSH D23.469.050.375.850.400 – kassinin
- MeSH D23.469.050.375.850.550 – neurokinin a
- MeSH D23.469.050.375.850.570 – neurokinin b
- MeSH D23.469.050.375.850.780 – physalaemin
- MeSH D23.469.050.375.850.890 – substance p
- MeSH D23.469.050.375.925 – urotensins
- MeSH D23.469.050.600 – platelet activating factor
- MeSH D23.469.050.650 – serotonin

==== MeSH D23.469.200 – chemokines ====
- MeSH D23.469.200.070 – beta-thromboglobulin
- MeSH D23.469.200.100 – chemokines, c
- MeSH D23.469.200.110 – chemokines, cc
- MeSH D23.469.200.110.050 – chemokine ccl1
- MeSH D23.469.200.110.100 – chemokine ccl18
- MeSH D23.469.200.110.125 – chemokine ccl26
- MeSH D23.469.200.110.150 – chemokine ccl3
- MeSH D23.469.200.110.200 – chemokine ccl4
- MeSH D23.469.200.110.250 – chemokine ccl5
- MeSH D23.469.200.110.550 – chemokine ccl11
- MeSH D23.469.200.110.850 – chemokine ccl17
- MeSH D23.469.200.110.870 – chemokine ccl19
- MeSH D23.469.200.110.880 – chemokine ccl20
- MeSH D23.469.200.110.890 – chemokine ccl21
- MeSH D23.469.200.110.900 – chemokine ccl22
- MeSH D23.469.200.110.910 – chemokine ccl24
- MeSH D23.469.200.110.930 – chemokine ccl27
- MeSH D23.469.200.110.990 – monocyte chemoattractant proteins
- MeSH D23.469.200.110.990.600 – chemokine ccl2
- MeSH D23.469.200.110.990.800 – chemokine ccl7
- MeSH D23.469.200.110.990.900 – chemokine ccl8
- MeSH D23.469.200.120 – chemokines, cxc
- MeSH D23.469.200.120.050 – chemokine cxcl1
- MeSH D23.469.200.120.075 – chemokine cxcl16
- MeSH D23.469.200.120.100 – chemokine cxcl2
- MeSH D23.469.200.120.250 – chemokine cxcl5
- MeSH D23.469.200.120.300 – chemokine cxcl6
- MeSH D23.469.200.120.450 – chemokine cxcl9
- MeSH D23.469.200.120.500 – chemokine cxcl10
- MeSH D23.469.200.120.550 – chemokine cxcl11
- MeSH D23.469.200.120.600 – chemokine cxcl12
- MeSH D23.469.200.120.650 – chemokine cxcl13
- MeSH D23.469.200.120.800 – interleukin-8
- MeSH D23.469.200.120.900 – platelet factor 4
- MeSH D23.469.200.130 – chemokines, cx3c
- MeSH D23.469.200.130.500 – chemokine cx3cl1
- MeSH D23.469.200.600 – macrophage inflammatory proteins
- MeSH D23.469.200.600.075 – chemokine ccl18
- MeSH D23.469.200.600.150 – chemokine ccl3
- MeSH D23.469.200.600.870 – chemokine ccl19
- MeSH D23.469.200.600.880 – chemokine ccl20
- MeSH D23.469.200.600.940 – chemokine cxcl2

==== MeSH D23.469.700 – prostaglandins, synthetic ====
- MeSH D23.469.700.275 – iloprost
- MeSH D23.469.700.630 – prostaglandin endoperoxides, synthetic
- MeSH D23.469.700.630.500 – 15-hydroxy-11 alpha,9 alpha-(epoxymethano)prosta-5,13-dienoic acid
- MeSH D23.469.700.645 – prostaglandins a, synthetic
- MeSH D23.469.700.660 – prostaglandins e, synthetic
- MeSH D23.469.700.660.050 – arbaprostil
- MeSH D23.469.700.660.200 – 16,16-dimethylprostaglandin e2
- MeSH D23.469.700.660.250 – enprostil
- MeSH D23.469.700.660.500 – misoprostol
- MeSH D23.469.700.660.750 – rioprostil
- MeSH D23.469.700.670 – prostaglandins f, synthetic
- MeSH D23.469.700.670.150 – carboprost
- MeSH D23.469.700.670.175 – cloprostenol
- MeSH D23.469.700.670.175.250 – bimatoprost
- MeSH D23.469.700.670.175.500 – travoprost
- MeSH D23.469.700.670.587 – latanoprost

=== MeSH D23.529 – intercellular signaling peptides and proteins ===
==== MeSH D23.529.024 – adipokines ====
- MeSH D23.529.024.249 – adiponectin
- MeSH D23.529.024.500 – leptin
- MeSH D23.529.024.750 – resistin
- MeSH D23.529.024.875 – zn-alpha-2-glycoprotein

==== MeSH D23.529.100 – angiogenic proteins ====
- MeSH D23.529.100.050 – angiopoietin-like proteins
- MeSH D23.529.100.050.100 – angiopoietin-like protein 1
- MeSH D23.529.100.050.200 – angiopoietin-like protein 2
- MeSH D23.529.100.050.300 – angiopoietin-like protein 3
- MeSH D23.529.100.050.400 – angiopoietin-like protein 4
- MeSH D23.529.100.050.550 – angiopoietin-like protein 6
- MeSH D23.529.100.050.700 – angiopoietin-like protein 7
- MeSH D23.529.100.050.800 – angiopoietin-like protein 8
- MeSH D23.529.100.100 – angiopoietins
- MeSH D23.529.100.100.100 – angiopoietin-1
- MeSH D23.529.100.100.200 – angiopoietin-2
- MeSH D23.529.100.450 – angiostatic proteins
- MeSH D23.529.100.450.500 – angiostatins
- MeSH D23.529.100.450.750 – endostatins
- MeSH D23.529.100.800 – vascular endothelial growth factors
- MeSH D23.529.100.800.200 – vascular endothelial growth factor a
- MeSH D23.529.100.800.300 – vascular endothelial growth factor b
- MeSH D23.529.100.800.400 – vascular endothelial growth factor c
- MeSH D23.529.100.800.500 – vascular endothelial growth factor d
- MeSH D23.529.100.800.600 – vascular endothelial growth factor, endocrine-gland-derived

==== MeSH D23.529.168 – b7 antigens ====
- MeSH D23.529.168.100 – b7-1 antigen
- MeSH D23.529.168.200 – b7-2 antigen
- MeSH D23.529.168.300 – b7-h1 antigen
- MeSH D23.529.168.500 – inducible t-cell co-stimulator ligand
- MeSH D23.529.168.800 – programmed cell death 1 ligand 2 protein
- MeSH D23.529.168.900 – v-set domain-containing t-cell activation inhibitor 1

==== MeSH D23.529.237 – ccn intercellular signaling proteins ====
- MeSH D23.529.237.100 – connective tissue growth factor
- MeSH D23.529.237.200 – cysteine-rich protein 61
- MeSH D23.529.237.600 – nephroblastoma overexpressed protein

==== MeSH D23.529.374 – cytokines ====
- MeSH D23.529.374.200 – chemokines
- MeSH D23.529.374.200.070 – beta-thromboglobulin
- MeSH D23.529.374.200.100 – chemokines, c
- MeSH D23.529.374.200.110 – chemokines, cc
- MeSH D23.529.374.200.110.050 – chemokine ccl1
- MeSH D23.529.374.200.110.100 – chemokine ccl18
- MeSH D23.529.374.200.110.125 – chemokine ccl26
- MeSH D23.529.374.200.110.150 – chemokine ccl3
- MeSH D23.529.374.200.110.200 – chemokine ccl4
- MeSH D23.529.374.200.110.250 – chemokine ccl5
- MeSH D23.529.374.200.110.550 – chemokine ccl11
- MeSH D23.529.374.200.110.850 – chemokine ccl17
- MeSH D23.529.374.200.110.870 – chemokine ccl19
- MeSH D23.529.374.200.110.880 – chemokine ccl20
- MeSH D23.529.374.200.110.890 – chemokine ccl21
- MeSH D23.529.374.200.110.900 – chemokine ccl22
- MeSH D23.529.374.200.110.910 – chemokine ccl24
- MeSH D23.529.374.200.110.930 – chemokine ccl27
- MeSH D23.529.374.200.110.990 – monocyte chemoattractant proteins
- MeSH D23.529.374.200.110.990.500 – chemokine ccl2
- MeSH D23.529.374.200.110.990.750 – chemokine ccl7
- MeSH D23.529.374.200.110.990.875 – chemokine ccl8
- MeSH D23.529.374.200.120 – chemokines, cxc
- MeSH D23.529.374.200.120.050 – chemokine cxcl1
- MeSH D23.529.374.200.120.075 – chemokine cxcl16
- MeSH D23.529.374.200.120.100 – chemokine cxcl2
- MeSH D23.529.374.200.120.250 – chemokine cxcl5
- MeSH D23.529.374.200.120.300 – chemokine cxcl6
- MeSH D23.529.374.200.120.450 – chemokine cxcl9
- MeSH D23.529.374.200.120.500 – chemokine cxcl10
- MeSH D23.529.374.200.120.550 – chemokine cxcl11
- MeSH D23.529.374.200.120.600 – chemokine cxcl12
- MeSH D23.529.374.200.120.650 – chemokine cxcl13
- MeSH D23.529.374.200.120.800 – interleukin-8
- MeSH D23.529.374.200.120.900 – platelet factor 4
- MeSH D23.529.374.200.130 – chemokines, cx3c
- MeSH D23.529.374.200.130.500 – chemokine cx3cl1
- MeSH D23.529.374.200.600 – macrophage inflammatory proteins
- MeSH D23.529.374.200.600.075 – chemokine ccl18
- MeSH D23.529.374.200.600.150 – chemokine ccl3
- MeSH D23.529.374.200.600.200 – chemokine ccl4
- MeSH D23.529.374.200.600.870 – chemokine ccl19
- MeSH D23.529.374.200.600.880 – chemokine ccl20
- MeSH D23.529.374.200.600.940 – chemokine cxcl2
- MeSH D23.529.374.305 – growth differentiation factor 15
- MeSH D23.529.374.410 – hematopoietic cell growth factors
- MeSH D23.529.374.410.240 – colony-stimulating factors
- MeSH D23.529.374.410.240.150 – erythropoietin
- MeSH D23.529.374.410.240.150.750 – epoetin alfa
- MeSH D23.529.374.410.240.350 – granulocyte colony-stimulating factor
- MeSH D23.529.374.410.240.350.500 – filgrastim
- MeSH D23.529.374.410.240.350.750 – lenograstim
- MeSH D23.529.374.410.240.375 – granulocyte-macrophage colony-stimulating factor
- MeSH D23.529.374.410.240.400 – interleukin-3
- MeSH D23.529.374.410.240.500 – macrophage colony-stimulating factor
- MeSH D23.529.374.410.240.750 – thrombopoietin
- MeSH D23.529.374.410.800 – stem cell factor
- MeSH D23.529.374.420 – hepatocyte growth factor
- MeSH D23.529.374.440 – interferons
- MeSH D23.529.374.440.890 – interferon type i
- MeSH D23.529.374.440.890.250 – interferon-alpha
- MeSH D23.529.374.440.890.250.500 – interferon alpha-2
- MeSH D23.529.374.440.890.275 – interferon-beta
- MeSH D23.529.374.440.890.275.500 – interferon beta-1a
- MeSH D23.529.374.440.890.275.750 – interferon beta-1b
- MeSH D23.529.374.440.893 – interferon-gamma
- MeSH D23.529.374.440.946 – interferon lambda
- MeSH D23.529.374.460 – interleukin 1 receptor antagonist protein
- MeSH D23.529.374.465 – interleukins
- MeSH D23.529.374.465.131 – interleukin-1
- MeSH D23.529.374.465.131.300 – interleukin-1alpha
- MeSH D23.529.374.465.131.600 – interleukin-1beta
- MeSH D23.529.374.465.155 – interleukin-2
- MeSH D23.529.374.465.162 – interleukin-21
- MeSH D23.529.374.465.169 – interleukin-3
- MeSH D23.529.374.465.186 – interleukin-4
- MeSH D23.529.374.465.202 – interleukin-5
- MeSH D23.529.374.465.224 – interleukin-6
- MeSH D23.529.374.465.246 – interleukin-7
- MeSH D23.529.374.465.312 – interleukin-8
- MeSH D23.529.374.465.377 – interleukin-9
- MeSH D23.529.374.465.510 – interleukin-10
- MeSH D23.529.374.465.511 – interleukin-11
- MeSH D23.529.374.465.512 – interleukin-12
- MeSH D23.529.374.465.512.249 – interleukin-12 subunit p35
- MeSH D23.529.374.465.512.500 – interleukin-12 subunit p40
- MeSH D23.529.374.465.513 – interleukin-13
- MeSH D23.529.374.465.515 – interleukin-15
- MeSH D23.529.374.465.516 – interleukin-16
- MeSH D23.529.374.465.517 – interleukin-17
- MeSH D23.529.374.465.518 – interleukin-18
- MeSH D23.529.374.465.550 – interleukin-23
- MeSH D23.529.374.465.550.249 – interleukin-12 subunit p40
- MeSH D23.529.374.465.550.500 – interleukin-23 subunit p19
- MeSH D23.529.374.465.575 – interleukin-24
- MeSH D23.529.374.465.600 – interleukin-27
- MeSH D23.529.374.465.850 – interleukin-33
- MeSH D23.529.374.465.925 – interleukin-22
- MeSH D23.529.374.470 – leukemia inhibitory factor
- MeSH D23.529.374.480 – lymphokines
- MeSH D23.529.374.480.372 – interleukin-2
- MeSH D23.529.374.480.428 – leukocyte migration-inhibitory factors
- MeSH D23.529.374.480.438 – lymphotoxin-alpha
- MeSH D23.529.374.480.615 – macrophage-activating factors
- MeSH D23.529.374.480.615.350 – interferon-gamma
- MeSH D23.529.374.480.625 – macrophage migration-inhibitory factors
- MeSH D23.529.374.480.700 – suppressor factors, immunologic
- MeSH D23.529.374.480.750 – transfer factor
- MeSH D23.529.374.500 – monokines
- MeSH D23.529.374.500.400 – interleukin-1
- MeSH D23.529.374.500.400.300 – interleukin-1alpha
- MeSH D23.529.374.500.400.600 – interleukin-1beta
- MeSH D23.529.374.500.800 – tumor necrosis factor-alpha
- MeSH D23.529.374.562 – oncostatin m
- MeSH D23.529.374.625 – osteopontin
- MeSH D23.529.374.656 – thymic stromal lymphopoietin
- MeSH D23.529.374.687 – transforming growth factor beta
- MeSH D23.529.374.687.100 – transforming growth factor beta1
- MeSH D23.529.374.687.200 – transforming growth factor beta2
- MeSH D23.529.374.750 – tumor necrosis factors
- MeSH D23.529.374.750.030 – cd27 ligand
- MeSH D23.529.374.750.061 – b-cell activating factor
- MeSH D23.529.374.750.065 – 4-1bb ligand
- MeSH D23.529.374.750.092 – cd30 ligand
- MeSH D23.529.374.750.124 – cd40 ligand
- MeSH D23.529.374.750.155 – cytokine tweak
- MeSH D23.529.374.750.186 – ectodysplasins
- MeSH D23.529.374.750.249 – fas ligand protein
- MeSH D23.529.374.750.500 – lymphotoxin-alpha
- MeSH D23.529.374.750.505 – lymphotoxin alpha1, beta2 heterotrimer
- MeSH D23.529.374.750.515 – lymphotoxin-beta
- MeSH D23.529.374.750.531 – ox40 ligand
- MeSH D23.529.374.750.562 – rank ligand
- MeSH D23.529.374.750.625 – tnf-related apoptosis-inducing ligand
- MeSH D23.529.374.750.626 – tumor necrosis factor-alpha
- MeSH D23.529.374.750.656 – tumor necrosis factor ligand superfamily member 13
- MeSH D23.529.374.750.690 – tumor necrosis factor ligand superfamily member 14
- MeSH D23.529.374.750.710 – tumor necrosis factor ligand superfamily member 15

==== MeSH D23.529.382 – egf family of proteins ====
- MeSH D23.529.382.249 – amphiregulin
- MeSH D23.529.382.374 – betacellulin
- MeSH D23.529.382.500 – epidermal growth factor
- MeSH D23.529.382.531 – epigen
- MeSH D23.529.382.562 – epiregulin
- MeSH D23.529.382.625 – heparin-binding egf-like growth factor
- MeSH D23.529.382.750 – transforming growth factor alpha

==== MeSH D23.529.400 – endothelins ====
- MeSH D23.529.400.225 – endothelin-1
- MeSH D23.529.400.235 – endothelin-2
- MeSH D23.529.400.245 – endothelin-3

==== MeSH D23.529.500 – ephrins ====
- MeSH D23.529.500.100 – ephrin-a1
- MeSH D23.529.500.200 – ephrin-a2
- MeSH D23.529.500.300 – ephrin-a3
- MeSH D23.529.500.400 – ephrin-a4
- MeSH D23.529.500.500 – ephrin-a5
- MeSH D23.529.500.600 – ephrin-b1
- MeSH D23.529.500.700 – ephrin-b2
- MeSH D23.529.500.800 – ephrin-b3

==== MeSH D23.529.624 – fibroblast growth factors ====
- MeSH D23.529.624.110 – fibroblast growth factor 1
- MeSH D23.529.624.120 – fibroblast growth factor 2
- MeSH D23.529.624.130 – fibroblast growth factor 3
- MeSH D23.529.624.140 – fibroblast growth factor 4
- MeSH D23.529.624.150 – fibroblast growth factor 5
- MeSH D23.529.624.160 – fibroblast growth factor 6
- MeSH D23.529.624.170 – fibroblast growth factor 7
- MeSH D23.529.624.180 – fibroblast growth factor 8
- MeSH D23.529.624.190 – fibroblast growth factor 9
- MeSH D23.529.624.200 – fibroblast growth factor 10

==== MeSH D23.529.742 – insulin-like peptides ====
- MeSH D23.529.742.500 – somatomedins
- MeSH D23.529.742.500.001 – insulin-like growth factor i
- MeSH D23.529.742.500.002 – insulin-like growth factor ii

==== MeSH D23.529.812 – kinins ====
- MeSH D23.529.812.169 – bradykinin
- MeSH D23.529.812.169.400 – kallidin
- MeSH D23.529.812.654 – kininogens
- MeSH D23.529.812.654.350 – kininogen, high-molecular-weight
- MeSH D23.529.812.654.400 – kininogen, low-molecular-weight
- MeSH D23.529.812.900 – tachykinins
- MeSH D23.529.812.900.354 – eledoisin
- MeSH D23.529.812.900.475 – kassinin
- MeSH D23.529.812.900.500 – neurokinin a
- MeSH D23.529.812.900.550 – neurokinin b
- MeSH D23.529.812.900.800 – physalaemin
- MeSH D23.529.812.900.866 – substance p

==== MeSH D23.529.850 – nerve growth factors ====
- MeSH D23.529.850.100 – brain-derived neurotrophic factor
- MeSH D23.529.850.212 – ciliary neurotrophic factor
- MeSH D23.529.850.325 – glia maturation factor
- MeSH D23.529.850.381 – glial cell line-derived neurotrophic factors
- MeSH D23.529.850.381.500 – glial cell line-derived neurotrophic factor
- MeSH D23.529.850.381.750 – neurturin
- MeSH D23.529.850.437 – nerve growth factor
- MeSH D23.529.850.494 – netrins
- MeSH D23.529.850.494.500 – netrin-1
- MeSH D23.529.850.550 – neuregulins
- MeSH D23.529.850.550.750 – neuregulin-1
- MeSH D23.529.850.775 – neurotrophin 3
- MeSH D23.529.850.831 – pigment epithelium-derived factor
- MeSH D23.529.850.887 – pituitary adenylate cyclase-activating polypeptide

==== MeSH D23.529.910 – platelet-derived growth factor ====
- MeSH D23.529.910.650 – proto-oncogene proteins c-sis
- MeSH D23.529.910.650.500 – becaplermin

==== MeSH D23.529.917 – progranulins ====
- MeSH D23.529.917.500 – granulins

==== MeSH D23.529.923 – semaphorins ====
- MeSH D23.529.923.374 – semaphorin-3a

==== MeSH D23.529.930 – serrate-jagged proteins ====
- MeSH D23.529.930.500 – jagged-1 protein
- MeSH D23.529.930.750 – jagged-2 protein

==== MeSH D23.529.942 – tgf-beta superfamily proteins ====
- MeSH D23.529.942.200 – bone morphogenetic proteins
- MeSH D23.529.942.200.100 – bone morphogenetic protein 1
- MeSH D23.529.942.200.200 – bone morphogenetic protein 2
- MeSH D23.529.942.200.300 – bone morphogenetic protein 3
- MeSH D23.529.942.200.400 – bone morphogenetic protein 4
- MeSH D23.529.942.200.500 – bone morphogenetic protein 5
- MeSH D23.529.942.200.600 – bone morphogenetic protein 6
- MeSH D23.529.942.200.700 – bone morphogenetic protein 7
- MeSH D23.529.942.200.900 – bone morphogenetic protein 15
- MeSH D23.529.942.200.910 – growth differentiation factor 2
- MeSH D23.529.942.200.950 – growth differentiation factor 10
- MeSH D23.529.942.300 – growth differentiation factors
- MeSH D23.529.942.300.049 – bone morphogenetic protein 15
- MeSH D23.529.942.300.100 – growth differentiation factor 1
- MeSH D23.529.942.300.200 – growth differentiation factor 2
- MeSH D23.529.942.300.300 – growth differentiation factor 3
- MeSH D23.529.942.300.500 – growth differentiation factor 5
- MeSH D23.529.942.300.600 – growth differentiation factor 6
- MeSH D23.529.942.300.800 – growth differentiation factor 9
- MeSH D23.529.942.300.900 – growth differentiation factor 10
- MeSH D23.529.942.300.915 – growth differentiation factor 15
- MeSH D23.529.942.300.925 – myostatin
- MeSH D23.529.942.550 – nodal signaling ligands
- MeSH D23.529.942.550.100 – growth differentiation factor 1
- MeSH D23.529.942.550.300 – growth differentiation factor 3
- MeSH D23.529.942.550.475 – left-right determination factors
- MeSH D23.529.942.550.650 – nodal protein
- MeSH D23.529.942.775 – transforming growth factor beta
- MeSH D23.529.942.775.100 – transforming growth factor beta1
- MeSH D23.529.942.775.200 – transforming growth factor beta2
- MeSH D23.529.942.775.300 – transforming growth factor beta3

==== MeSH D23.529.948 – tolloid-like metalloproteinases ====
- MeSH D23.529.948.500 – bone morphogenetic protein 1

==== MeSH D23.529.960 – transforming growth factors ====
- MeSH D23.529.960.360 – transforming growth factor alpha

==== MeSH D23.529.984 – wnt proteins ====
- MeSH D23.529.984.050 – wnt-5a protein
- MeSH D23.529.984.100 – wnt1 protein
- MeSH D23.529.984.200 – wnt2 protein
- MeSH D23.529.984.300 – wnt3 protein
- MeSH D23.529.984.350 – wnt3a protein
- MeSH D23.529.984.400 – wnt4 protein

=== MeSH D23.704 – phytochemicals ===
==== MeSH D23.704.500 – phytosterols ====
- MeSH D23.704.500.071 – brassinosteroids
- MeSH D23.704.500.143 – ecdysteroids
- MeSH D23.704.500.669 – sitosterols
- MeSH D23.704.500.808 – stigmasterol
- MeSH D23.704.500.904 – withanolides

=== MeSH D23.767 – pigments, biological ===
==== MeSH D23.767.193 – bile pigments ====
- MeSH D23.767.193.184 – bilirubin
- MeSH D23.767.193.184.200 – biliverdine
- MeSH D23.767.193.727 – urobilin
- MeSH D23.767.193.852 – urobilinogen

==== MeSH D23.767.261 – carotenoids ====
- MeSH D23.767.261.050 – beta carotene
- MeSH D23.767.261.375 – lycopene
- MeSH D23.767.261.700 – retinoids
- MeSH D23.767.261.700.050 – acitretin
- MeSH D23.767.261.700.150 – adapalene
- MeSH D23.767.261.700.200 – bexarotene
- MeSH D23.767.261.700.250 – etretinate
- MeSH D23.767.261.700.270 – fenretinide
- MeSH D23.767.261.700.325 – isotretinoin
- MeSH D23.767.261.700.690 – retinaldehyde
- MeSH D23.767.261.700.735 – retinyl esters
- MeSH D23.767.261.700.780 – tretinoin
- MeSH D23.767.261.700.780.500 – alitretinoin
- MeSH D23.767.261.700.860 – vitamin a
- MeSH D23.767.261.887 – xanthophylls
- MeSH D23.767.261.887.249 – canthaxanthin
- MeSH D23.767.261.887.374 – cryptoxanthins
- MeSH D23.767.261.887.374.500 – beta-cryptoxanthin
- MeSH D23.767.261.887.500 – lutein
- MeSH D23.767.261.887.625 – macular pigment
- MeSH D23.767.261.887.750 – zeaxanthins
- MeSH D23.767.261.925 – zeta carotene

==== MeSH D23.767.405 – flavins ====
- MeSH D23.767.405.650 – riboflavin
- MeSH D23.767.405.650.249 – flavin-adenine dinucleotide
- MeSH D23.767.405.650.500 – flavin mononucleotide

==== MeSH D23.767.712 – phytochrome ====
- MeSH D23.767.712.249 – phytochrome a
- MeSH D23.767.712.500 – phytochrome b

==== MeSH D23.767.727 – porphyrins ====
- MeSH D23.767.727.250 – coproporphyrins
- MeSH D23.767.727.280 – deuteroporphyrins
- MeSH D23.767.727.340 – etioporphyrins
- MeSH D23.767.727.462 – hematoporphyrins
- MeSH D23.767.727.462.400 – hematoporphyrin derivative
- MeSH D23.767.727.462.400.200 – dihematoporphyrin ether
- MeSH D23.767.727.620 – mesoporphyrins
- MeSH D23.767.727.640 – metalloporphyrins
- MeSH D23.767.727.640.587 – heme
- MeSH D23.767.727.640.587.462 – hemin
- MeSH D23.767.727.725 – protoporphyrins
- MeSH D23.767.727.880 – uroporphyrins

==== MeSH D23.767.831 – pterins ====
- MeSH D23.767.831.742 – xanthopterin

==== MeSH D23.767.930 – retinal pigments ====
- MeSH D23.767.930.750 – opsins
- MeSH D23.767.930.750.249 – cone opsins
- MeSH D23.767.930.750.500 – rod opsins
- MeSH D23.767.930.750.500.001 – melanopsin
- MeSH D23.767.930.750.500.500 – rhodopsin

=== MeSH D23.946 – toxins, biological ===
==== MeSH D23.946.123 – bacterial toxins ====
- MeSH D23.946.123.090 – bacillus thuringiensis toxins
- MeSH D23.946.123.179 – botulinum toxins
- MeSH D23.946.123.179.050 – botulinum toxins, type a
- MeSH D23.946.123.194 – cholera toxin
- MeSH D23.946.123.208 – cord factors
- MeSH D23.946.123.257 – cyanobacteria toxins
- MeSH D23.946.123.257.250 – lyngbya toxins
- MeSH D23.946.123.257.500 – microcystins
- MeSH D23.946.123.257.750 – saxitoxin
- MeSH D23.946.123.305 – diphtheria toxin
- MeSH D23.946.123.329 – endotoxins
- MeSH D23.946.123.329.500 – lipopolysaccharides
- MeSH D23.946.123.329.500.500 – lipid a
- MeSH D23.946.123.329.500.600 – o antigens
- MeSH D23.946.123.353 – exfoliatins
- MeSH D23.946.123.574 – pseudomonas aeruginosa exotoxin a
- MeSH D23.946.123.794 – shiga toxins
- MeSH D23.946.123.794.095 – shiga toxin
- MeSH D23.946.123.794.100 – shiga toxin 1
- MeSH D23.946.123.794.124 – shiga toxin 2
- MeSH D23.946.123.868 – streptolysins
- MeSH D23.946.123.893 – tetanus toxin
- MeSH D23.946.123.946 – virulence factors, bordetella
- MeSH D23.946.123.946.040 – adenylate cyclase toxin
- MeSH D23.946.123.946.690 – pertussis toxin

==== MeSH D23.946.330 – enterotoxins ====
- MeSH D23.946.330.150 – cholera toxin
- MeSH D23.946.330.575 – shiga toxins
- MeSH D23.946.330.575.100 – shiga toxin
- MeSH D23.946.330.575.120 – shiga toxin 1
- MeSH D23.946.330.575.124 – shiga toxin 2

==== MeSH D23.946.350 – exotoxins ====
- MeSH D23.946.350.500 – exfoliatins
- MeSH D23.946.350.625 – pseudomonas aeruginosa exotoxin a
- MeSH D23.946.350.750 – streptolysins

==== MeSH D23.946.381 – glycation end products, advanced ====
- MeSH D23.946.381.250 – dietary advanced glycation end products
- MeSH D23.946.381.625 – glycated proteins
- MeSH D23.946.381.625.500 – glycated serum proteins
- MeSH D23.946.381.625.500.250 – glycated hemoglobin
- MeSH D23.946.381.625.500.500 – glycated serum albumin

==== MeSH D23.946.580 – marine toxins ====
- MeSH D23.946.580.080 – amphidinols
- MeSH D23.946.580.160 – ciguatoxins
- MeSH D23.946.580.230 – cnidarian venoms
- MeSH D23.946.580.370 – fish venoms
- MeSH D23.946.580.450 – holothurin
- MeSH D23.946.580.565 – lyngbya toxins
- MeSH D23.946.580.590 – mollusk venoms
- MeSH D23.946.580.590.162 – conotoxins
- MeSH D23.946.580.590.162.720 – omega-conotoxins
- MeSH D23.946.580.590.162.720.700 – omega-conotoxin gvia
- MeSH D23.946.580.590.325 – eledoisin
- MeSH D23.946.580.590.662 – saxitoxin
- MeSH D23.946.580.710 – okadaic acid
- MeSH D23.946.580.800 – polyether toxins
- MeSH D23.946.580.800.250 – bryostatins
- MeSH D23.946.580.800.500 – ciguatoxins
- MeSH D23.946.580.800.750 – okadaic acid
- MeSH D23.946.580.830 – saxitoxin
- MeSH D23.946.580.910 – tetrodotoxin

==== MeSH D23.946.587 – mycotoxins ====
- MeSH D23.946.587.142 – aflatoxins
- MeSH D23.946.587.142.075 – aflatoxin b1
- MeSH D23.946.587.142.100 – aflatoxin m1
- MeSH D23.946.587.175 – amanitins
- MeSH D23.946.587.175.111 – alpha-amanitin
- MeSH D23.946.587.272 – citrinin
- MeSH D23.946.587.370 – cytochalasins
- MeSH D23.946.587.370.370 – cytochalasin b
- MeSH D23.946.587.370.450 – cytochalasin d
- MeSH D23.946.587.385 – fumonisins
- MeSH D23.946.587.401 – gliotoxin
- MeSH D23.946.587.475 – ibotenic acid
- MeSH D23.946.587.531 – killer factors, yeast
- MeSH D23.946.587.559 – masked mycotoxins
- MeSH D23.946.587.587 – muscimol
- MeSH D23.946.587.697 – ochratoxins
- MeSH D23.946.587.725 – patulin
- MeSH D23.946.587.735 – penicillic acid
- MeSH D23.946.587.755 – phalloidine
- MeSH D23.946.587.800 – sporidesmins
- MeSH D23.946.587.850 – sterigmatocystin
- MeSH D23.946.587.915 – tenuazonic acid
- MeSH D23.946.587.933 – trichothecenes
- MeSH D23.946.587.933.900 – trichodermin
- MeSH D23.946.587.933.950 – trichothecenes, type a
- MeSH D23.946.587.933.950.500 – t-2 toxin
- MeSH D23.946.587.933.975 – trichothecenes, type b
- MeSH D23.946.587.933.987 – trichothecenes, type c
- MeSH D23.946.587.989 – zearalenone

==== MeSH D23.946.833 – venoms ====
- MeSH D23.946.833.033 – amphibian venoms
- MeSH D23.946.833.033.112 – batrachotoxins
- MeSH D23.946.833.033.137 – bombesin
- MeSH D23.946.833.033.163 – bufotenin
- MeSH D23.946.833.033.728 – physalaemin
- MeSH D23.946.833.065 – arthropod venoms
- MeSH D23.946.833.065.055 – ant venoms
- MeSH D23.946.833.065.115 – bee venoms
- MeSH D23.946.833.065.115.060 – apamin
- MeSH D23.946.833.065.115.580 – melitten
- MeSH D23.946.833.065.830 – scorpion venoms
- MeSH D23.946.833.065.830.150 – charybdotoxin
- MeSH D23.946.833.065.870 – spider venoms
- MeSH D23.946.833.065.870.324 – agatoxins
- MeSH D23.946.833.065.870.324.500 – omega-agatoxin iva
- MeSH D23.946.833.065.970 – wasp venoms
- MeSH D23.946.833.230 – cnidarian venoms
- MeSH D23.946.833.300 – exenatide
- MeSH D23.946.833.370 – fish venoms
- MeSH D23.946.833.590 – mollusk venoms
- MeSH D23.946.833.590.162 – conotoxins
- MeSH D23.946.833.590.162.720 – omega-conotoxins
- MeSH D23.946.833.590.162.720.700 – omega-conotoxin gvia
- MeSH D23.946.833.590.325 – eledoisin
- MeSH D23.946.833.590.662 – saxitoxin
- MeSH D23.946.833.850 – snake venoms
- MeSH D23.946.833.850.325 – elapid venoms
- MeSH D23.946.833.850.325.139 – bungarotoxins
- MeSH D23.946.833.850.325.180 – cobra cardiotoxin proteins
- MeSH D23.946.833.850.325.200 – cobra neurotoxin proteins
- MeSH D23.946.833.850.325.600 – three finger toxins
- MeSH D23.946.833.850.960 – viper venoms
- MeSH D23.946.833.850.960.200 – crotalid venoms
- MeSH D23.946.833.850.960.200.050 – ancrod
- MeSH D23.946.833.850.960.200.105 – batroxobin
- MeSH D23.946.833.850.960.200.158 – bothrops jararaca venom
- MeSH D23.946.833.850.960.200.210 – crotoxin

==== MeSH D23.946.896 – virulence factors ====
- MeSH D23.946.896.245 – pseudomonas aeruginosa exotoxin a
- MeSH D23.946.896.490 – transcription activator-like effectors
- MeSH D23.946.896.980 – virulence factors, bordetella
- MeSH D23.946.896.980.040 – adenylate cyclase toxin
- MeSH D23.946.896.980.690 – pertussis toxin

The list continues at List of MeSH codes (D25).
