= Ten Feizi =

British molecular biologist

Ten Feizi FMedSci FRS
- Born: 1937 (age 88–89); Nicosia, British Cyprus
- Education: University College London; Royal Free Medical School
- Scientific career
- Workplaces: Imperial College London; Columbia University; Rockefeller University; Hammersmith Hospital
- Thesis: Cold agglutinins and mycoplasma pneumoniae (1969)

Ten Feizi FMedSci FRS (born in 1937) is a Turkish Cypriot/British molecular biologist who is Professor and Director of the Glycosciences Laboratory at Imperial College London. Her research considers the structure and function of glycans. She was awarded the Society for Glycobiology Rosalind Kornfeld award in 2014. She was also awarded the Fellowship of the Academy of Medical Sciences in 2021.

== Early life and education ==
Born in Nicosia, Cyprus in 1937 to a Turkish Cypriot family, Feizi completed her primary and secondary education in Cyprus before moving to London to continue her studies. She studied medicine at the Royal Free Medical School, and graduated with distinction in 1961. After qualifying as a doctor, Feizi worked as a registrar in surgery and haematology at the Hammersmith Hospital. During her placement at the Hammersmith, Feizi became interested in atypical pneumonia. Almost one third of patients who suffer from atypical pneumonia develop cold agglutinins in their blood, which are misdirected antibodies that bind to red blood cells. She demonstrated that mycoplasma can stimulate the production of auto-antibodies on binding to red blood cells. She earned her MD degree at University College London, where she researched mycoplasma pneumoniae. As an early career researcher, Feizi joined the Columbia University Vagelos College of Physicians and Surgeons as a College of Physicians and Surgeons of British Columbia Fellow, where she worked with Elvin A. Kabat on glycans. She was later appointed a research fellow at Rockefeller University, where she extracted carbohydrates in the laboratory of Richard Krause.

== Research and career ==
In 1973 Feizi joined the Medical Research Council Clinical Research Centre, where she was appointed Head of the Glycoconjugates Section. She eventually established the Imperial College London Glycosciences Laboratory. She was made a Professor at Imperial College London in 1994.

Her early research considered cold agglutinins, sensitive, misdirected antibodies that build up following mycoplasma pneumoniae. The antigen on red blood cells that is bound by these cold agglutinins is known as the I antigen. Feizi worked with Sen-itiroh Hakomori to understand this antigen, which she showed was expressed on the carbohydrate backbone. Feizi considered the relationship between the I antigen and mycoplasma, and showed that a sialic-capped form of poly-N-acetyllactosamine acts as a mycoplasma receptor. This directs I antigens to the glycan receptor. She also studied the structures of the Ii antigen system; and established that they existed as both branched and linear poly-N-acetyllactosamine chains. Her research group were the first to sequence the envelope glycoprotein GP120 and elucidate their interactions with the mannose-specific macrophage endocytosis receptor.

Feizi showed that during both cellular differentiation and the transformation of normal cells to tumorous cells, anti-li blood group antibodies could be used to track changes in glycosylation. She studied the ability of animal lectins to bind to oligosaccharides. Her interest in both the structure and recognition of glycans led her to develop a new glycan screening protocol. Feizi created the neoglycolipid (NGL)-based oligosaccharide microarray system, which allowed her to explore the whole spectrum of glycans, specific cells and glycoproteins. In 2002 her system was the first to encompass entire glycomes. Her glycoarray system, which is supported by the Wellcome Trust, is one of the world's most diverse, which allows better understanding of host–pathogen interactions and the interactions between glycans and proteins in disease processes. The system was used to assign the host-cell receptors in SV40 and Influenza A virus subtype H1N1.

== Awards ==
- 1994 American Society for Clinical Pathology Outstanding Research Award
- 2014 Society for Glycobiology Rosalind Kornfeld Lifetime Achievement Award
- 2020 Royal Society of Chemistry Carbohydrate Group Haworth Memorial Lectureship

She is a Fellow of the Academy of Medical Sciences, the Royal College of Physicians and the Royal College of Pathologists. In May 2021 she was elected Fellow of the Royal Society.

== Selected publications ==
- Feizi, Ten (1985). "Demonstration by monoclonal antibodies that carbohydrate structures of glycoproteins and glycolipids are onco-developmental antigens". Nature. 314 (6006): 53–57. Bibcode:1985Natur.314...53F. doi:10.1038/314053a0. ISSN 0028-0836. PMID 2579340. S2CID 4257789.
- Fukui, Shigeyuki; Feizi, Ten; Galustian, Christine; Lawson, Alexander M.; Chai, Wengang (3 September 2002). "Oligosaccharide microarrays for high-throughput detection and specificity assignments of carbohydrate-protein interactions". Nature Biotechnology. 20 (10): 1011–1017. doi:10.1038/nbt735. ISSN 1087-0156. PMID 12219077. S2CID 19655076.
- Stamatatos, Leo; Sather, Noah (18 November 2011). "Faculty of 1000 evaluation for A potent and broad neutralizing antibody recognizes and penetrates the HIV glycan shield". doi:10.3410/f.13371099.14741243.
