= Pan-T antigens =

Antigens found on all T cells

Pan-T antigens are antigens found on all T cells.

They include CD2, CD3, CD5 and CD7.
