= GCNT2 =

Protein-coding gene in the species Homo sapiens

Identifiers
- Aliases: GCNT2, CCAT, CTRCT13, GCNT2C, GCNT5, IGNT, II, NACGT1, NAGCT1, ULG3, bA360O19.2, bA421M1.1, glucosaminyl (N-acetyl) transferase 2, I-branching enzyme (I blood group), glucosaminyl (N-acetyl) transferase 2 (I blood group)
- External IDs: OMIM: 600429; MGI: 1100870; GeneCards: GCNT2
Enzyme activity
EC #	BRENDA	ExPASy	KEGG	MetaCyc
2.4.1.150	↗	↗	↗	↗

Gene location (Human)
Chr.	Chromosome 6 (human)
Band	6p24.3-p24.2	Start	10,492,223 bp
Band	6p24.3-p24.2	End	10,629,368 bp

Gene location (Mouse)
Chr.	Chromosome 13 (mouse)
Band	13 A3.3|13 20.12 cM	Start	41,013,230 bp
Band	13 A3.3|13 20.12 cM	End	41,114,368 bp
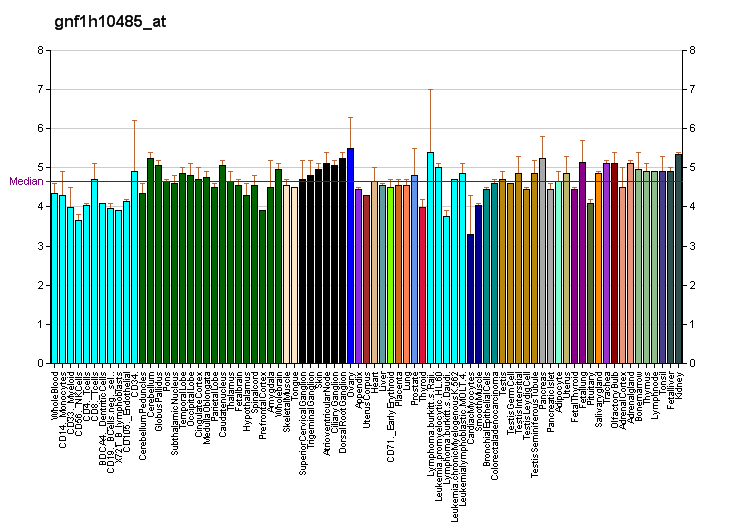

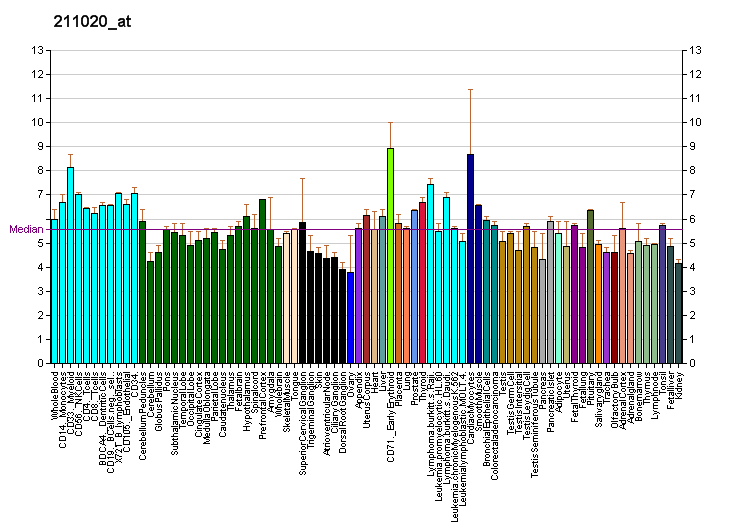
RNA expression pattern
Bgee	Human / Mouse (ortholog); Top expressed in: gonad; left ventricle; testicle; apex of heart; duodenum; mucosa of transverse colon; prostate; stomach; human kidney; body of stomach / Top expressed in: lumbar spinal ganglion; granulocyte; right lung lobe; olfactory epithelium; blood; ascending aorta; dorsal striatum; aortic valve; islet of Langerhans; tail of embryo; More reference expression data
BioGPS	More reference expression data
Gene ontology
Molecular function	transferase activity; glycosyltransferase activity; acetylglucosaminyltransferase activity; N-acetyllactosaminide beta-1,6-N-acetylglucosaminyltransferase activity
Cellular component	integral component of membrane; Golgi membrane; membrane; cellular component; Golgi apparatus
Biological process	negative regulation of cell-substrate adhesion; maintenance of lens transparency; positive regulation of heterotypic cell-cell adhesion; positive regulation of cell migration; glycosaminoglycan biosynthetic process; multicellular organism development; protein glycosylation; transforming growth factor beta receptor signaling pathway; positive regulation of cell population proliferation; posttranscriptional regulation of gene expression; positive regulation of epithelial to mesenchymal transition; positive regulation of protein kinase B signaling; positive regulation of ERK1 and ERK2 cascade
Sources:Amigo / QuickGO
Orthologs
Databases	NCBI: entry; OMA: entry
Species	Human	Mouse
Entrez	2651	14538
Ensembl	ENSG00000111846; ENSG00000285222	ENSMUSG00000021360
UniProt	Q8N0V5	P97402
RefSeq (mRNA)	NM_001491; NM_145649; NM_145655; NM_001374747	NM_008105; NM_023887; NM_133219
RefSeq (protein)	NP_663624.1; NP_001482.1; NP_663630.2; NP_001482; NP_663624 NP_663630; NP_001361676; NP_001482.1; NP_663630.2; NP_663624.1	NP_032131; NP_076376; NP_573482
Location (UCSC)	Chr 6: 10.49 – 10.63 Mb	Chr 13: 41.01 – 41.11 Mb
PubMed search
- Wikidata
View/Edit Human	View/Edit Mouse

N-acetyllactosaminide beta-1,6-N-acetylglucosaminyl-transferase is an enzyme that in humans is encoded by the GCNT2 gene.

This gene encodes the enzyme responsible for formation of the blood group I antigen. The i and I antigens are distinguished by linear and branched poly-N-acetyllactosaminoglycans, respectively. The encoded protein is the I-branching enzyme, a beta-1,6-N-acetylglucosaminyltransferase responsible for the conversion of fetal i antigen to adult I antigen in erythrocytes during embryonic development. Mutations in this gene have been associated with adult i blood group phenotype. Alternatively spliced transcript variants encoding different isoforms have been described.
