= Beta-galactosyl-N-acetylglucosaminylgalactosylglucosyl-ceramide beta-1,3-acetylglucosaminyltransferase =

Class of enzymes

Identifiers
- EC no.: 2.4.1.163
- CAS no.: 85638-39-7

Databases
- IntEnz: IntEnz view
- BRENDA: BRENDA entry
- ExPASy: NiceZyme view
- KEGG: KEGG entry
- MetaCyc: metabolic pathway
- PRIAM: profile
- PDB structures: RCSB PDB PDBe PDBsum
Search
- PMC: articles
- PubMed: articles
- NCBI: proteins

Beta-galactosyl-N-acetylglucosaminylgalactosylglucosyl-ceramide beta-1,3-acetylglucosaminyltransferase (EC 2.4.1.163, uridine diphosphoacetylglucosamine-acetyllactosaminide beta1->3-acetylglucosaminyltransferase, poly-N-acetyllactosamine extension enzyme, UDP-N-acetyl-D-glucosamine:beta-D-galactosyl-1,4-N-acetyl-beta-D-glucosaminyl-1,3-beta-D-galactosyl-1,4-beta-D-glucosylceramide beta-1,3-acetylglucosaminyltransferase) is an enzyme with systematic name UDP-N-acetyl-D-glucosamine:beta-D-galactosyl-(1->4)-N-acetyl-beta-D-glucosaminyl-(1->3)-beta-D-galactosyl-(1->4)-beta-D-glucosyl-(1<->1)-ceramide 3-beta-N-acetylglucosaminyltransferase. This enzyme catalyses the following chemical reaction

UDP-N-acetyl-D-glucosamine + beta-D-galactosyl-(1->4)-N-acetyl-beta-D-glucosaminyl-(1->3)-beta-D-galactosyl-(1->4)-beta-D-glucosyl-(1<->1)-ceramide $\rightleftharpoons$ UDP + N-acetyl-D-glucosaminyl-(1->3)-beta-D-galactosyl-(1->4)-N-acetyl-beta-D-glucosaminyl-(1->3)-beta-D-galactosyl-(1->4)-beta-D-glucosyl-(1<->1)-ceramide

This enzyme requires Mn^{2+}.
