= Platelet basic protein =

Protein found in humans

PPBP
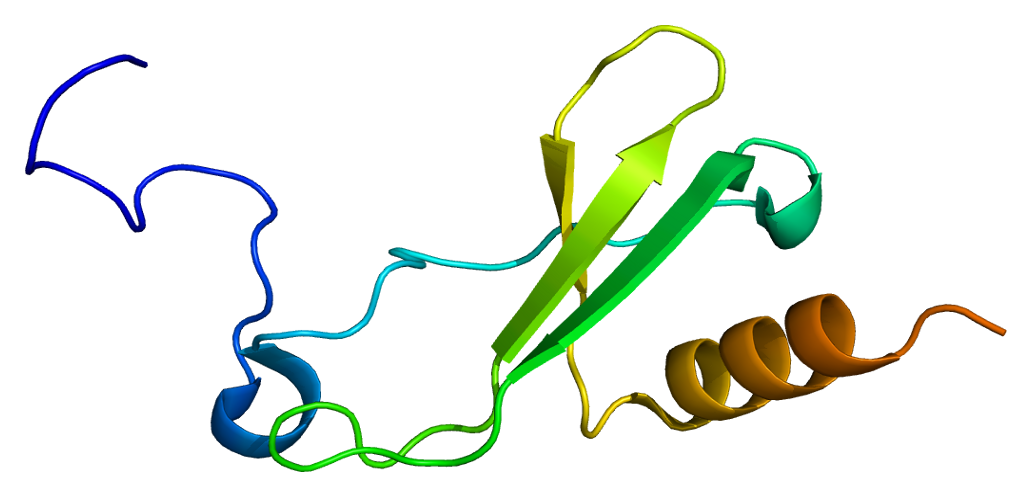

Identifiers
- Aliases: PPBP, B-TG1, Beta-TG, CTAP-III, CTAP3, CTAPIII, CXCL7, LA-PF4, LDGF, MDGF, NAP-2, PBP, SCYB7, TC1, TC2, TGB, TGB1, THBGB, THBGB1, pro-platelet basic protein
- External IDs: OMIM: 121010; MGI: 1888712; GeneCards: PPBP
Available structures
PDB	Ortholog search: PDBe RCSB
PDB	List of PDB id codes 1TVX, 1F9P, 1NAP

Gene location (Human)
Chr.	Chromosome 4 (human)
Band	4q13.3	Start	73,986,439 bp
Band	4q13.3	End	73,988,190 bp

Gene location (Mouse)
Chr.	Chromosome 5 (mouse)
Band	5|5 E1	Start	90,916,377 bp
Band	5|5 E1	End	90,917,922 bp
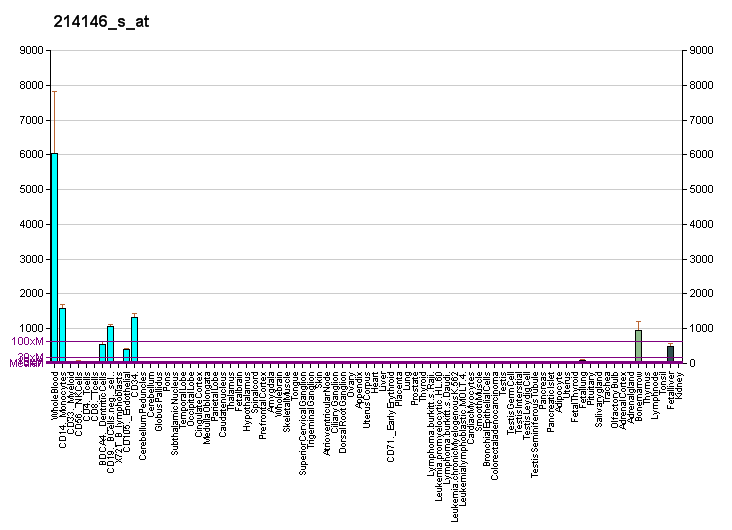
RNA expression pattern
Bgee	Human / Mouse (ortholog); Top expressed in: monocyte; trabecular bone; granulocyte; blood; bone marrow cell; periodontal fiber; spleen; decidua; right lung; testicle / Top expressed in: tibiofemoral joint; umbilical cord; blood; spleen; fetal liver hematopoietic progenitor cell; body of femur; right lung lobe; human fetus; endocardial cushion; yolk sac; More reference expression data
BioGPS	More reference expression data
Gene ontology
Molecular function	growth factor activity; cytokine activity; glucose transmembrane transporter activity; CXCR chemokine receptor binding; chemokine activity; protein binding
Cellular component	platelet alpha granule lumen; extracellular region; extracellular space; tertiary granule lumen; platelet alpha granule
Biological process	response to lipopolysaccharide; regulation of cell population proliferation; chemotaxis; positive regulation of cell division; platelet degranulation; defense response to bacterium; inflammatory response; immune response; chemokine-mediated signaling pathway; defense response; positive regulation of neutrophil chemotaxis; antimicrobial humoral immune response mediated by antimicrobial peptide; regulation of signaling receptor activity; neutrophil degranulation; cell chemotaxis; G protein-coupled receptor signaling pathway; glucose transmembrane transport; neutrophil chemotaxis; leukocyte chemotaxis; cellular response to lipopolysaccharide
Sources:Amigo / QuickGO
Orthologs
Databases	NCBI: entry; OMA: entry
Species	Human	Mouse
Entrez	5473	57349
Ensembl	ENSG00000163736	ENSMUSG00000029372
UniProt	P02775	Q9EQI5
RefSeq (mRNA)	NM_002704	NM_023785
RefSeq (protein)	NP_002695	NP_076274
Location (UCSC)	Chr 4: 73.99 – 73.99 Mb	Chr 5: 90.92 – 90.92 Mb
PubMed search
- Wikidata
View/Edit Human	View/Edit Mouse

Platelet basic protein (PBP) is a protein that in humans is encoded by the gene PPBP (previously CXCL7). PBP is a precursor protein that is cleaved into multiple distinct active proteins, notable Connective tissue-activating peptide III (CTAP-III), Beta-thromboglobulin (Beta-TG), Neutrophil-activating peptide 2 (NAP-2), TC-1, and TC-2. PPBP is first translated into the precursor molecule pro-platelet basic protein (PPBP), the first 34 amino acids of which correspond to the signal peptide, while the remaining amino acid residues at positions 35-128 compose PBP.

PBP is a protein that is released in large amounts from platelets following their activation. It stimulates various processes including mitogenesis, synthesis of extracellular matrix, glucose metabolism and synthesis of plasminogen activator.

== Connective tissue-activating peptide III ==
Connective tissue-activating peptide III (CTAP-III), also called Low-affinity platelet factor IV (LA-PF4), is a protein that corresponds to positions 44-128 of PPBP. This protein has mitogenic effects: stimulating DNA synthesis and mitosis. It also triggers prostaglandin E2 secretion and synthesis of hyaluronic acid and sulfated glycosaminoglycan.

== Neutrophil-activating peptide 2 ==
Neutrophil-activating peptide 2 (NAP-2) is a chemokine that corresponds to positions 59-128 of PPBP. NAP-2 activates and attracts neutrophils through interaction with the receptors CXCR1 and CXCR2. There are also shorter (and longer) versions of this peptide with similar effects, with NAP-2(1-63) (corresponding to positions 59-121 of PPBP) being the most potent.

== TC-1 and TC-2 ==
TC-1 and TC-2 are antimicrobial proteins corresponding to positions 59-126 and 44-126 of the PPBP protein respectively.

== β-Thromboglobulin ==
β-Thromboglobulin (β-TG), or beta-thromboglobulin, is a protein that corresponds to positions 48-128 of PPBP. It is secreted by platelets along with platelet factor 4 and platelet-derived growth factor, and forms a homodimer. Along with platelet factor 4 (PF4), β-TG is one of the best-characterized platelet-specific proteins. β-TG and PF4 are stored in platelet alpha granules and are released during platelet activation. As a result, they are useful markers of platelet activation. β-TG also has multiple biological activities, for instance being involved in maturation of megakaryocytes.

=== Biological actions ===
β-TG is a chemoattractant, strongly for fibroblasts and weakly for neutrophils. It is a stimulator of mitogenesis, extracellular matrix synthesis, glucose metabolism, and plasminogen activator synthesis in human fibroblasts.

β-TG also affects megakaryocyte maturation, and thus helps in regulating platelet production.

=== Clinical uses ===
Levels of β-TG is used to index platelet activation. It is measured by ELISA in blood plasma or urine, and often in conjunction with PF4.

=== Influences ===
β-TG levels may increase with age. It is elevated in diabetes mellitus.

β-TG levels have been found to be increased by treatment with the synthetic estrogen ethinylestradiol, though were not significantly increased by the natural estrogen estradiol valerate. Levels of β-TG have also been found to be increased or unchanged during normal pregnancy.
