= Mucin-1 =

Protein of the mucin family

MUC1
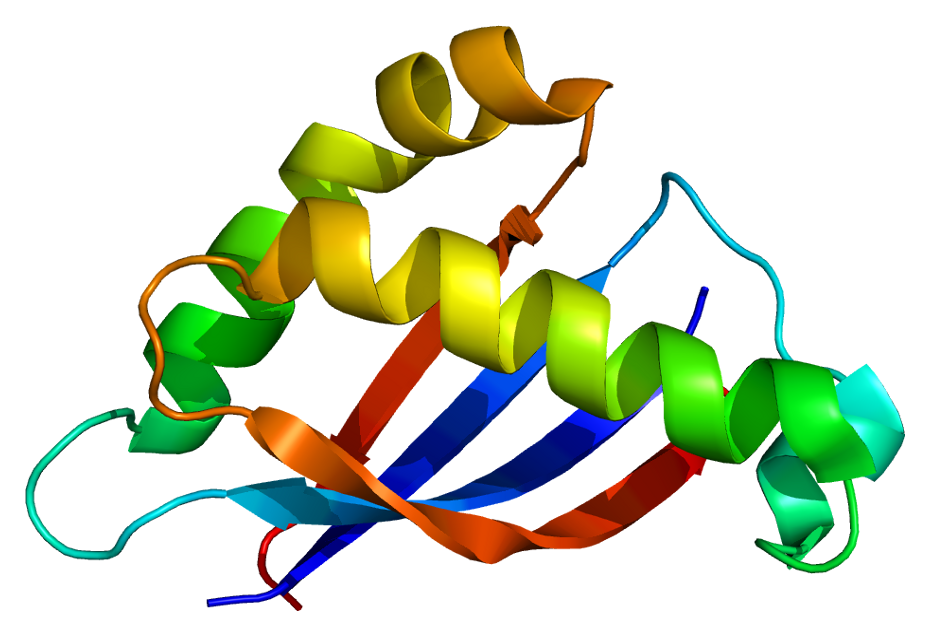

Identifiers
- Aliases: MUC1, ADMCKD, ADMCKD1, CA 15-3, CD227, EMA, H23AG, KL-6, MAM6, MCD, MCKD, MCKD1, MUC-1, MUC-1/SEC, MUC-1/X, MUC1/ZD, PEM, PEMT, PUM, mucin 1, cell surface associated, ADTKD2, Ca15-3, Mucin-1
- External IDs: OMIM: 158340; GeneCards: MUC1
Available structures
PDB	Human UniProt search: PDBe RCSB
PDB	List of PDB id codes 1SM3, 2ACM

Gene location (Human)
Chr.	Chromosome 1 (human)
Band	1q22	Start	155,185,824 bp
Band	1q22	End	155,192,916 bp
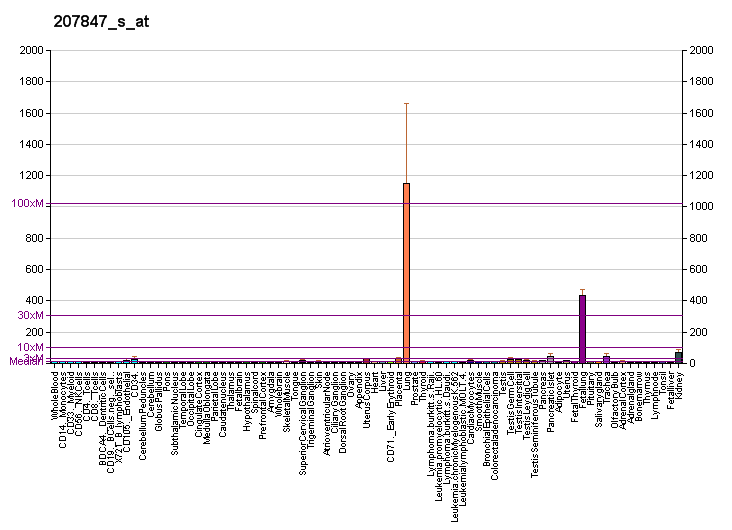

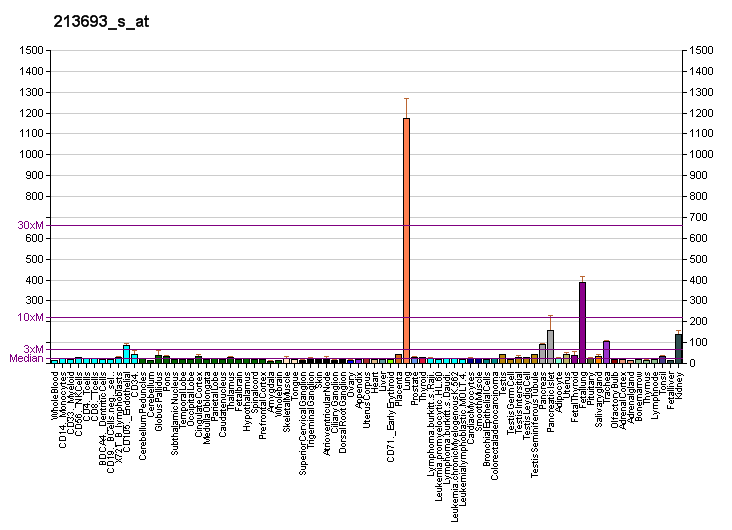

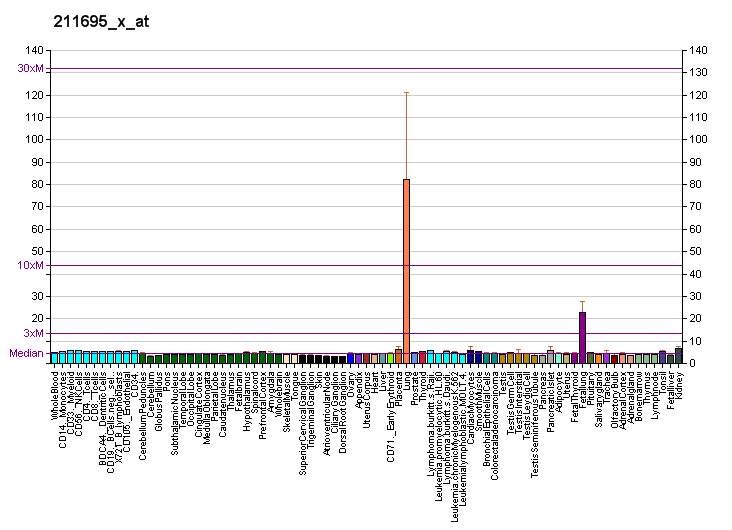
RNA expression pattern
Bgee	Human / Mouse (ortholog); Top expressed in: pylorus; pancreatic ductal cell; nasal epithelium; right uterine tube; cardia; olfactory zone of nasal mucosa; lower lobe of lung; buccal mucosa cell; gastric mucosa; palpebral conjunctiva / n/a; More reference expression data
BioGPS	More reference expression data
Gene ontology
Molecular function	protein binding; transcription coregulator activity; RNA polymerase II cis-regulatory region sequence-specific DNA binding; p53 binding
Cellular component	extracellular region; cytoplasm; integral component of membrane; nucleus; Golgi lumen; integral component of plasma membrane; apical plasma membrane; membrane; vesicle; extracellular exosome; extracellular space; plasma membrane
Biological process	positive regulation of histone H4 acetylation; regulation of transcription from RNA polymerase II promoter in response to stress; DNA damage response, signal transduction by p53 class mediator resulting in cell cycle arrest; negative regulation of intrinsic apoptotic signaling pathway in response to DNA damage by p53 class mediator; negative regulation of cell adhesion mediated by integrin; DNA damage response, signal transduction by p53 class mediator resulting in transcription of p21 class mediator; positive regulation of transcription from RNA polymerase II promoter in response to stress; O-glycan processing; negative regulation of transcription by competitive promoter binding; stimulatory C-type lectin receptor signaling pathway; cytokine-mediated signaling pathway
Sources:Amigo / QuickGO
Orthologs
Databases	NCBI: entry; OMA: entry
Species	Human	Mouse
Entrez	4582	n/a
Ensembl	ENSG00000185499	n/a
UniProt	P15941; Q7Z551	n/a
RefSeq (mRNA)	NM_001018016; NM_001018017; NM_001018021; NM_001044390; NM_001044391 NM_001044392; NM_001044393; NM_001204285; NM_001204286; NM_001204287; NM_001204288; NM_001204289; NM_001204290; NM_001204291; NM_001204292; NM_001204293; NM_001204294; NM_001204295; NM_001204296; NM_001204297; NM_002456; NM_182741; NM_001371720	n/a
RefSeq (protein)	NP_001018016; NP_001018017; NP_001037855; NP_001037856; NP_001037857 NP_001037858; NP_001191214; NP_001191215; NP_001191216; NP_001191217; NP_001191218; NP_001191219; NP_001191220; NP_001191221; NP_001191222; NP_001191223; NP_001191224; NP_001191225; NP_001191226; NP_002447; NP_001358649; NP_001191217.1; NP_001191225.1; NP_001037856.1	n/a
Location (UCSC)	Chr 1: 155.19 – 155.19 Mb	n/a
PubMed search		n/a
- Wikidata
View/Edit Human

Mucin-1 (MUC-1) is a heterodimer transmembrane protein of the mucin family encoded in humans by the MUC1 gene. It is cleaved into two chains: mucin-1 subunit alpha (MUC1-NT; MUC1-alpha) and mucin-1 subunit beta (MUC-CT; MUC1-beta). These subunits differ in size due to proteolytic cleavage of the translated precursor protein in the endoplasmic reticulum. The larger subunit of MUC-1 is characterized by numerous O-glycosylated bonds and a terminal sialic acid, creating a net negative charge on MUC-1. The smaller subunit contains a juxtamembrane region of the extracellular area, a transmembrane domain, and the cytoplasmic tail. The extracellular domain of MUC-1 is composed of 20 identical amino acid tandem repeats (TR). Each tandem repeat contains two serine and three threonine amino acid residues, providing five sites for potential O-glycosylation. MUC-1 protein is estimated to weigh 120 to 225 kDA.

The N-terminus of MUC-1 (MUC-1 N) contains variable number tandem repeats (VNTRs) of (PDTRPAPGSTAP PAHGVTSA). VNTR provides sites for glycosylation on serine and threonine residues. The peptide backbone exhibits glycosidic bonds between serine and threonine within MUC-1 N. Within the cytoplasmic tail of MUC-1, multiple phosphorylation sites exist due to the presence of threonine, tyrosine and serine amino acid residues. Alterations to the cytoplasmic tail may affect movement through the Golgi apparatus, thus affecting glycosylation of the tandem repeat domains of MUC-1. The C-terminus of MUC-1 (MUC-1 C) is short—the majority of weight comes from N-glycosylation. Research has shown that the C-terminus is linked to the development of inflammation and cancer.

MUC-1 is located in the apical membrane on simple epithelial cell surfaces. These cells are found in the human kidney, gallbladder, stomach, lung, pancreas, mammary gland, and the female reproductive tract. MUC-1 is removed from the membrane by endocytosis, internalized, re-glycosylated and recycled to the cell membrane.

== Function ==
O-glycosylation and N-glycosylation in MUC-1 contribute to the formation of mucin. MUC-1 is a transcriptional coactivator involved in the activity and stabilization of enzymes and transcription of metabolic functions. MUC-1 regulates tyrosine kinase signaling receptors, which promote synthesis of biosynthetic intermediates used in cell growth. In normal cells, the tandem repeats and cytoplasmic tail of MUC-1 are significant in the regulation and progression of metastatic cancer. Alterations to these areas have shown a propensity of metastasis and progression in comparison to unaltered MUC-1 domains.

MUC-1 has many functions. MUC-1 is an inhibitor for cell-to-cell extracellular interactions for both normal and malignant cells. The extracellular sperm protein–enterokinase–agarin (SEA) domain of MUC-1 contributes to a variety of functions including: inhibition of immune response, resistance to stimuli, and regulation of cell shedding. MUC-1 provides protection to the apical membrane to prevent rupture, as well as environmental and immune attack. MUC-1 has been shown to repair epithelia through the activation of epigenetic reprogramming, epithelial-mesenchymal transition and self-renewing (stemness) in maintaining epithelial cell homeostasis.

== In cancer ==
MUC-1 is over expressed in many forms of cancer. Given, MUC-1 is 10 times higher in cancer cells than normal cells, an over expression of MUC-1 in cancer can be indicative of aggressive, metastatic cancer, having a low response to therapy and survival rate. MUC-1 also exhibits altered glycosylation and aberrant surface distribution patterns in tumor cells. Tumor related MUC-1 disrupts and inhibits cell-cell and cell-matrix interactions and adherence. Inhibition of cellular interactions diminishes the adherence of immune effector cells to malignant cells, thereby creating an immunosuppressive effect. MUC-1 in cancerous epithelial cells exhibits a loss of polarity. This loss of polarity creates incomplete carbohydrate side chains, allowing the formation of new abnormal side chains, thus increasing tumorigenesis. In normal cells, MUC-1 is isolated to the apical surface of the cell. In cancer cells, over expression of MUC-1 is seen throughout the cell's nucleus, plasma membrane and cytoplasm. In addition to the membranous isoform, an alternatively spliced mucin-1 is secreted extracellularly.

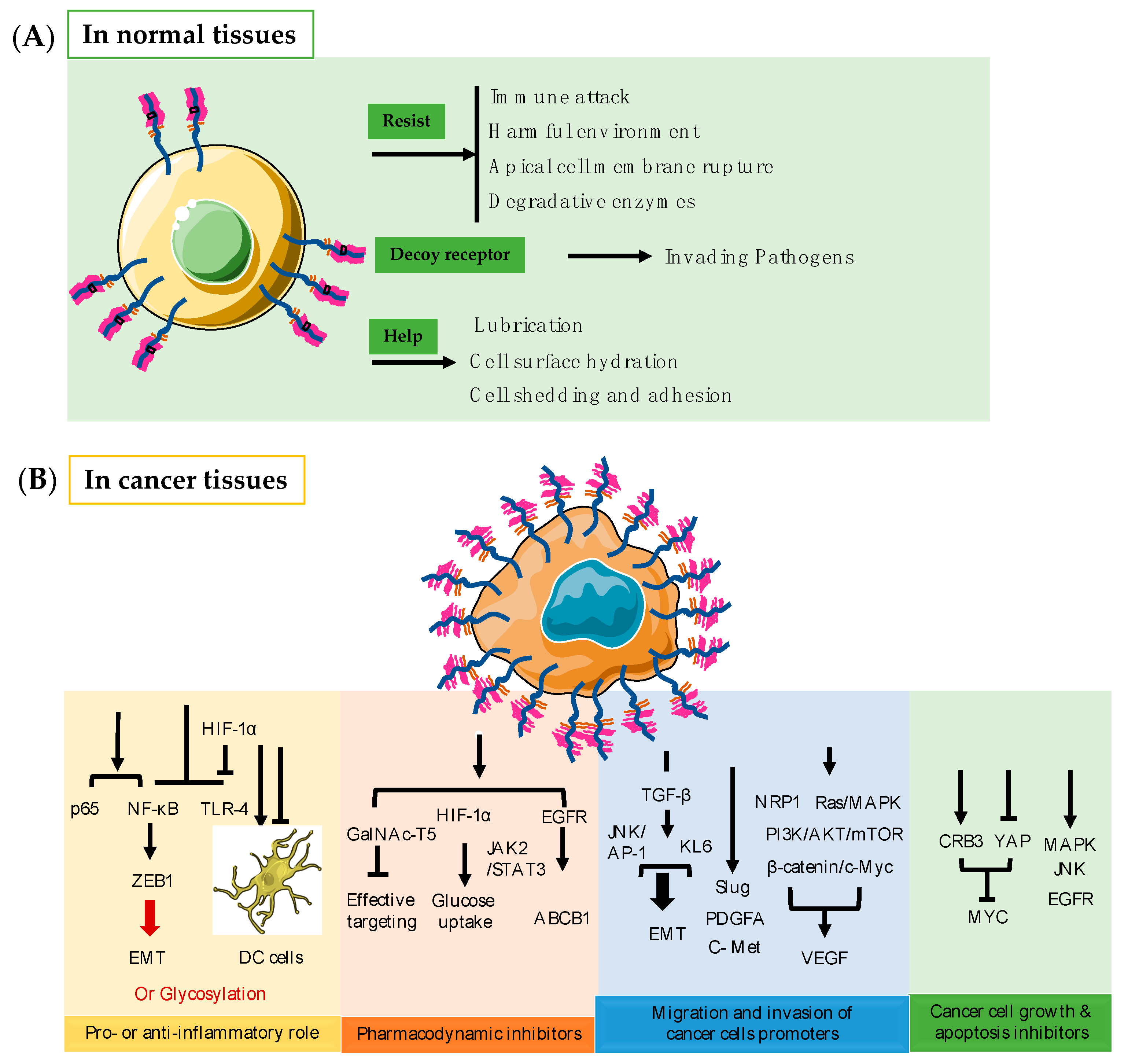
Muc-1 in cancer cell activity

MUC-1 in cancer is underglycosylated, causing interactions to form between MUC-1 core protein, transmembrane receptors, and extracellular components. The intercellular interaction between MUC-1 and the receptor ICAM-1 facilitates endothelial and epithelial cell interactions, allowing circulating cancer cells to adhere in the inner lining of blood vessels and thus migrate. MUC-1 over expression is controlled through transcription changes, post-translational, and amplification modifications. In transcription, MUC-1 in cancer is regulated through STAT proteins, hormones, hypoxia, and growth factors. MUC-1 plays a role in the increase of the autophagy of mitochondria, a process called mitophagy. An increase in mitophagy triggers the development and progression of cancer.

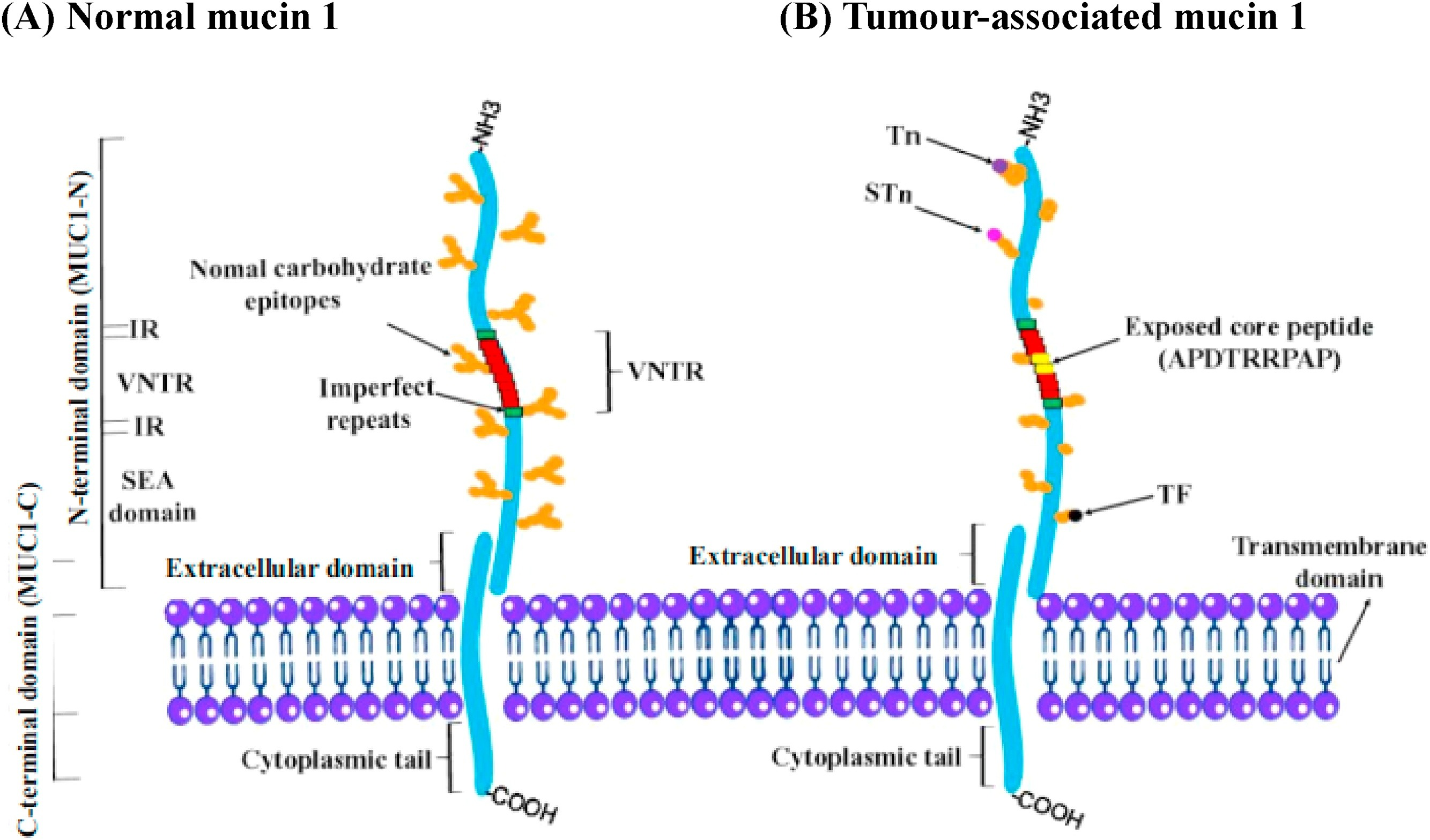
MUC-1 cancer cell

== Breast cancer ==
MUC-1 is shown to be over expressed in 90% of triple-negative breast cancer (TNBC). MUC-1 C increases the progression of TNBC. MUC-1 C chronically activates pro-inflammatory pathways in cancer cells. Triple-negative breast cancer stem cells rely on MUC-1 C for epithelial-mesenchymal transition, chromatin remodeling and epigenetic programming, which allow the cancer cells to avoid DNA damage and immune evasion. MUC-1 allows triple-negative breast cancer stem cells to engage in linear plasticity, a transition from one pathway into another, thus supporting the progression of TNBC. Recent studies have shown changes of MUC-1 family antigences (CA 15-3, CA 27.29 and MCA) in saliva in breast cancer patients. Downregulated MUC1 was associated with HER2(+), high Ki-67 and G II-III. It showed a statistically significant increase in the cytokines VEGF, IL-1β, IL-2, IL-4, IL-10, and IL-18 against the background of reduced hormonal levels of estrogen and progesterone. The changes occurring locally in the oral cavity reflect complex biochemical shifts in the reactivity of the immune system of the entire body. This is manifested in the suppression of the anti-inflammatory activity of MUC1 due to proinflammatory cytokines that have passed the hematosalivary barrier and are activated by oncogenic processes occurring in breast cancer. The suppression of the anti-inflammatory activity also occurs because of a deficiency of estrogens and progesterone, inhibiting the expression of MUC1 on the epithelial cells of the oral mucosa. This cascade of biochemical reactions occurs due to the aggressive nature of the oncological process in HER2(+) breast cancer.

== Ovarian cancer ==
MUC-1 is over expressed in over 90% of all epithelial ovarian cancer. Currently, MUC-1 CT is being used to create therapies for ovarian cancer. Targeting MUC-1 CT to reduce expression has potential to control late-stage epithelial ovarian cancer. Since MUC-1 C does not contain a kinase or enzymatic function, targeting the protein's catalytic site is rendered useless. Research looking at breast cancer and MUC-1 showed promise in peptide blocking and disrupting MUC-1 CT interactions with specific effectors, decreasing proliferation, migration and invasion of metastatic breast cancer in vitro and inhibiting tumor growth and reoccurrence in mouse models. The results show promise for epithelial ovarian cancer therapies.

== Cancer therapy ==
Studies have shown MUC-1 over expression creates drug resistance during chemotherapy by altering glycolytic metabolism. Over expression of MUC-1 decreases the apoptotic response to DNA damage, and increases anti-apoptotic Bcl-XL and PI3K/Akt pathways. MUC-1 in tumor cells suppresses mitochondria from releasing apoptotic factors, creating resistance to genotoxic anticancer agents. Cancer therapies are being developed to specifically target MUC-1 proteins, including peptide-based therapies, MUC-1 antibodies/conjugates, and MUC-1 vaccinations. Peptide-based therapies develop peptides that target tumors and attack membranes with a cytotoxic effect. Murine antibodies that are reactive with MUC-1 VNTR domain have been produced through immunization using milk fat globule membranes, isolated mucin preparations, and tumor cells. Developed MUC-1 monoclonal antibodies are used in diagnosis of cancer, and creation of target therapies.
