= Cloprostenol =

Chemical compound

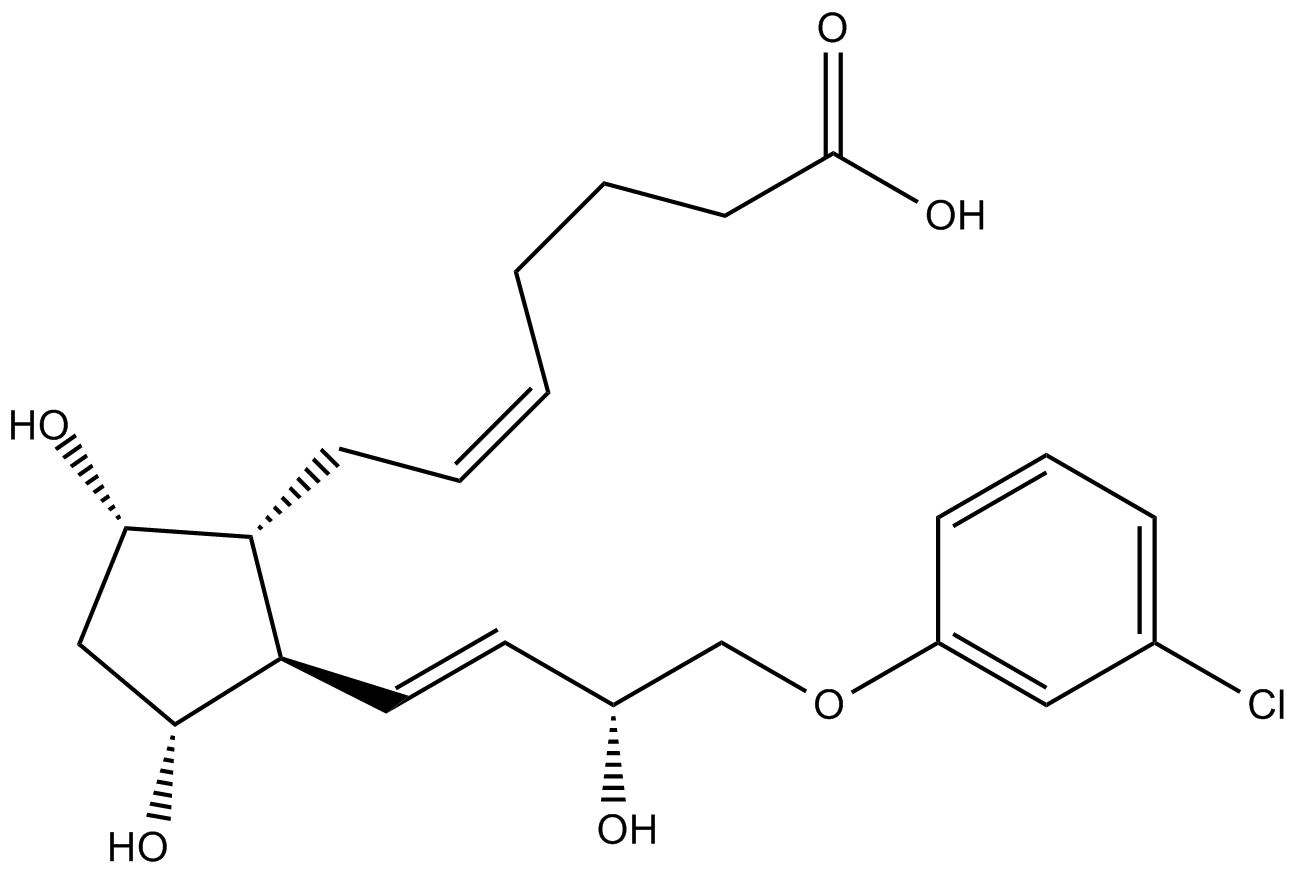

Clinical data
- Trade names: Cyclomate, Estrumate
- Routes of administration: Intramuscular
- ATCvet code: QG02AD90 (WHO)

Pharmacokinetic data
- Excretion: 67% renal, 25% fecal

Identifiers
- IUPAC name: (5Z)-7-{(1R,2R,3R,5S)-2-[(1E,3R)-4-(3-Chlorophenoxy)-3-hydroxy-1-buten-1-yl]-3,5-dihydroxycyclopentyl}-5-heptenoic acid
- CAS Number: 40665–92–7
- PubChem CID: 5311053
- ChemSpider: 4470590
- UNII: 4208238832
- CompTox Dashboard (EPA): DTXSID50860575 DTXSID7048372, DTXSID50860575
- ECHA InfoCard: 100.050.009

Chemical and physical data
- Formula: C_{22}H_{29}ClO_{6}
- Molar mass: 424.915
- 3D model (JSmol): Interactive image
- SMILES: c1cc(cc(c1)Cl)OC[C@@H](/C=C/[C@H]2[C@@H](C[C@@H]([C@@H]2C/C=C\CCCC(=O)O)O)O)O
- InChI: InChI=1S/C22H29ClO6/c23-15-6-5-7-17(12-15)29-14-16(24)10-11-19-18(20(25)13-21(19)26)8-3-1-2-4-9-22(27)28/h1,3,5-7,10-12,16,18-21,24-26H,2,4,8-9,13-14H2,(H,27,28)/b3-1-,11-10+/t16-,18-,19-,20+,21-/m1/s1; Key:VJGGHXVGBSZVMZ-QIZQQNKQSA-N

Cloprostenol is a synthetic analogue of prostaglandin F_{2α} (PGF_{2α}). It is a potent luteolytic agent; this means that, within hours of administration, it causes the corpus luteum to stop production of progesterone, and to reduce in size over several days. This effect is used in animals to induce estrus and to cause abortion.

Cloprostenol is registered for veterinary use under the name Estrumate, manufactured by Merck.
