= CXCL2 =

Mammalian protein found in humans

Identifiers
- Aliases: CXCL2, CINC-2a, GRO2, GROb, MGSA-b, MIP-2a, MIP2, MIP2A, SCYB2, C-X-C motif chemokine ligand 2
- External IDs: OMIM: 139110; MGI: 108068; GeneCards: CXCL2
Available structures
PDB	Ortholog search: PDBe RCSB
PDB	List of PDB id codes 1QNK

Gene location (Human)
Chr.	Chromosome 4 (human)
Band	4q13.3	Start	74,097,040 bp
Band	4q13.3	End	74,099,196 bp

Gene location (Mouse)
Chr.	Chromosome 5 (mouse)
Band	5 E1|5 44.78 cM	Start	91,039,100 bp
Band	5 E1|5 44.78 cM	End	91,040,974 bp
RNA expression pattern
Bgee	Human / Mouse (ortholog); Top expressed in: mucosa of paranasal sinus; right lobe of liver; vena cava; saphenous vein; cartilage tissue; lower lobe of lung; beta cell; upper lobe of lung; upper lobe of left lung; gastric mucosa / Top expressed in: endothelial cell of lymphatic vessel; left lobe of liver; spermatocyte; embryo; embryo; spermatid; stroma of bone marrow; islet of Langerhans; trachea; cumulus cell; More reference expression data
BioGPS	n/a
Gene ontology
Molecular function	protein binding; CXCR chemokine receptor binding; cytokine activity; chemokine activity
Cellular component	extracellular region; extracellular space
Biological process	chemokine-mediated signaling pathway; response to molecule of bacterial origin; response to lipopolysaccharide; chemotaxis; positive regulation of neutrophil chemotaxis; immune response; regulation of cell population proliferation; cell chemotaxis; defense response; inflammatory response; antimicrobial humoral immune response mediated by antimicrobial peptide; regulation of signaling receptor activity; G protein-coupled receptor signaling pathway; cytokine-mediated signaling pathway; neutrophil chemotaxis; leukocyte chemotaxis; cellular response to lipopolysaccharide
Sources:Amigo / QuickGO
Orthologs
Databases	NCBI: entry; OMA: entry
Species	Human	Mouse
Entrez	2920	14825
Ensembl	ENSG00000081041	ENSMUSG00000029380
UniProt	P19875	P12850
RefSeq (mRNA)	NM_002089	NM_008176
RefSeq (protein)	NP_002080	NP_032202
Location (UCSC)	Chr 4: 74.1 – 74.1 Mb	Chr 5: 91.04 – 91.04 Mb
PubMed search
- Wikidata
View/Edit Human	View/Edit Mouse

chemokine (C-X-C motif) ligand 2

Identifiers
- Symbol: CXCL2
- Alt. symbols: SCYB2, GRO2, GROb, MIP-2a, MGSA-b, CINC-2a
- NCBI gene: 2920
- HGNC: 4603
- OMIM: 139110
- RefSeq: NM_002089
- UniProt: P19875

Other data
- Locus: Chr. 4 q21
Search for
- Structures: Swiss-model
- Domains: InterPro

Chemokine (C-X-C motif) ligand 2 (CXCL2) is a small cytokine belonging to the CXC chemokine family that is also called macrophage inflammatory protein 2-alpha (MIP2-alpha), Growth-regulated protein beta (Gro-beta) and Gro oncogene-2 (Gro-2). CXCL2 is 90% identical in amino acid sequence as a related chemokine, CXCL1. This chemokine is secreted by monocytes and macrophages and is chemotactic for polymorphonuclear leukocytes and hematopoietic stem cells. The gene for CXCL2 is located on human chromosome 4 in a cluster of other CXC chemokines. CXCL2 mobilizes cells by interacting with a cell surface chemokine receptor called CXCR2.

CXCL2, like related chemokines, is also a powerful neutrophil chemoattractant and is involved in many immune responses including wound healing, cancer metastasis, and angiogenesis. A study was published in 2013 testing the role of CXCL2, CXCL3, and CXCL1 in the migration of airway smooth muscle cells (ASMCs) migration which plays a significant role in asthma. The results of this study showed that CXCL2 and CXCL3 both help with the mediation of normal and asthmatic ASMC migration through different mechanisms.

== Clinical development ==
CXCL2 in combination with the CXCR4 inhibitor plerixafor rapidly mobilizes hematopoietic stem cells into the peripheral blood.

This rapid peripheral blood stem cell mobilization regimen entered Phase 2 clinical trials in 2021 in development by Magenta Therapeutics as a new method to collect stem cells for bone marrow transplantation.
