= CD7 =

Mammalian protein found in humans

Identifiers
- Aliases: CD7, GP40, LEU-9, TP41, Tp40, CD7 molecule
- External IDs: OMIM: 186820; MGI: 88344; GeneCards: CD7

Gene location (Human)
Chr.	Chromosome 17 (human)
Band	17q25.3	Start	82,314,868 bp
Band	17q25.3	End	82,317,608 bp

Gene location (Mouse)
Chr.	Chromosome 11 (mouse)
Band	11 E2|11 84.85 cM	Start	120,927,573 bp
Band	11 E2|11 84.85 cM	End	120,930,244 bp
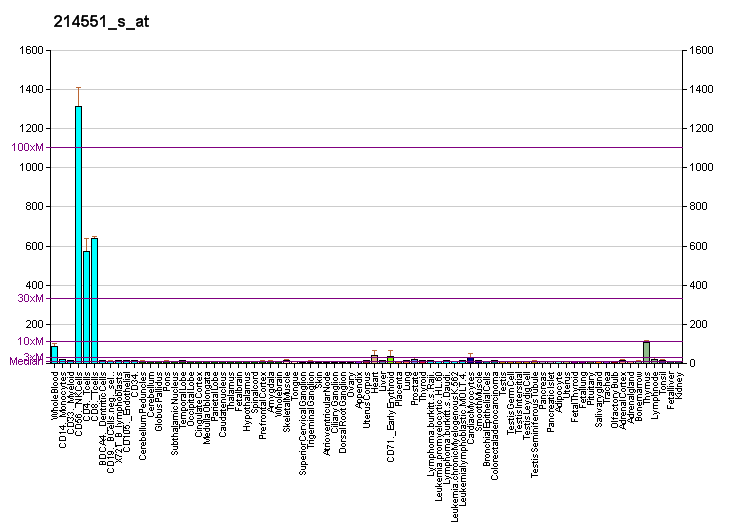

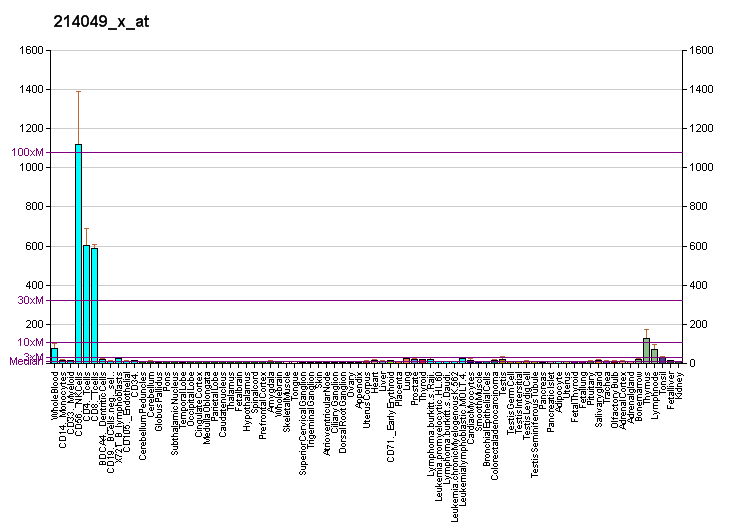
RNA expression pattern
Bgee	Human / Mouse (ortholog); Top expressed in: granulocyte; blood; spleen; appendix; lymph node; thymus; mucosa of transverse colon; upper lobe of left lung; bone marrow cell; right lung / Top expressed in: morula; zygote; primary oocyte; blood; secondary oocyte; duodenum; thymus; spleen; jejunum; intestinal villus; More reference expression data
BioGPS	More reference expression data
Gene ontology
Molecular function	signaling receptor activity
Cellular component	integral component of membrane; plasma membrane; membrane
Biological process	adaptive immune response; T cell activation; immune response; transmembrane receptor protein tyrosine kinase signaling pathway; immune system process
Sources:Amigo / QuickGO
Orthologs
Databases	NCBI: entry; OMA: entry
Species	Human	Mouse
Entrez	924	12516
Ensembl	ENSG00000173762	ENSMUSG00000025163
UniProt	P09564	P50283
RefSeq (mRNA)	NM_006137	NM_009854
RefSeq (protein)	NP_006128	NP_033984
Location (UCSC)	Chr 17: 82.31 – 82.32 Mb	Chr 11: 120.93 – 120.93 Mb
PubMed search
- Wikidata
View/Edit Human	View/Edit Mouse

CD7 (Cluster of Differentiation 7) is a protein that in humans is encoded by the CD7 gene.

== Function ==
This gene encodes a transmembrane protein which is a member of the immunoglobulin superfamily. This protein is found on thymocytes and mature T cells. It plays an essential role in T-cell interactions and also in T-cell/B-cell interaction during early lymphoid development.

== See also ==
- Cluster of differentiation
- DC-7

== Interactions ==
CD7 has been shown to interact with PIK3R1.

== Clinical significance ==
CD7 can be aberrantly expressed in refractory anaemia with excess blasts (RAEB) and may confer a worse prognosis. Also, a lack of CD7 expression could insinuate mycosis fungoides (MF) or Sezary syndrome (SS).
