= Ii antigen system =

Human blood group system

Chemical structure of N-acetyllactosamine, the base unit in I and i antigens

The Ii antigen system is a human blood group system based upon a gene on chromosome 6 and consisting of the I antigen and the i antigen. The I antigen is normally present on the cell membrane of red blood cells in all adults, while the i antigen is present in fetuses and newborns.

== I and i antigens ==
Adult red blood cells express I antigen abundantly. Developing fetuses and newborns express i antigen until around 13-20 months after birth, when I antigen starts to be expressed instead. Like ABH antigens, which make up the ABO blood group, I and i antigens are not restricted to the red blood cell membrane, but are found on most human cells and in body fluids such as saliva.

The I and i antigens are carbohydrate structures composed of repeating units of N-acetyllactosamine (LacNAc), and are located on the interior of structures carrying ABH and Lewis antigens. LacNAc repeats are made by the enzymes B3GNT1 and B4GALT1. The i antigen is made of linear repeats, while the structure of the I antigen is branched. Unlike most other blood groups, the two antigens are not encoded by different alleles; rather, I-branching enzyme converts i antigen to I antigen by adding branches. The gene encoding I-branching enzyme is located on chromosome 6.

== Clinical diagnostic ==
Clinical testing in patient care for Ii antigens follows published minimum quality and operational requirements, similar to red cell genotyping for any of the other recognized blood group systems. Molecular analysis can identify gene variants (alleles) that may affect Ii antigens expression on the red cell membrane.

== Clinical significance ==
The function of I and i antigens are unknown but may be related to hematopoiesis, the production of blood. The rapid conversion from i to I antigens after birth suggests that I antigen plays an important role in adult red blood cells. The presence of the linear i antigen in fetuses, rather than the branched I antigen, may have developed as an evolutionary mechanism to prevent ABO hemolytic disease of the fetus and newborn. Enhanced expression of i antigen is associated with conditions involving stress hematopoiesis such as leukemia and sickle cell disease.

Transient autoantibodies against I antigen are common, especially after infection by Mycoplasma pneumoniae, and are rarely significant except in cold agglutinin disease. Transient antibodies against i antigen are common after infectious mononucleosis and are also not clinically significant. Antibodies which recognize both I and i antigens are termed anti-j antibodies.

=== Cold agglutinin disease ===
The autoantibodies involved in cold agglutinin disease are usually against I antigen. The antibodies are usually IgM (kappa subtype), unlike transient autoantibodies which are generally IgG. Cold-reactive IgM antibodies (cold agglutinins) bind to I antigen on red blood cells, and unlike IgG, are able to cause agglutination of red blood cells and activate complement to cause hemolysis, leading to anemia.

=== Adult i phenotype ===
Rarely, individuals have the i antigen on their red blood cells into adulthood, known as the adult i phenotype. This is due to the presence of a mutation in the GCNT2 gene which encodes the I-branching enzyme. These individuals have alloantibodies against the I antigen, though these are typically cold agglutinins and are unlikely to cause transfusion reactions.

The adult i phenotype is associated with congenital cataracts, most markedly in Japanese and Taiwanese people and least markedly in Caucasian people. Cataracts occur when i antigen rather than I antigen is present on the epithelium of the lens, due to a mutation in the form of the I-branching enzyme which is expressed in lens epithelium, IGNTB.

The adult i phenotype is inherited in a recessive manner.

== History ==
The I antigen was first described in 1956 and the i antigen was discovered in 1960. I and i were the first discovered antigens which change significantly during human development. The letter I was chosen to reflect the "individuality" of a person studied who lacked the I antigen.

== Other species ==
A similar blood group system with a developmental change resembling the Ii system (with human neonatal cells expressing i antigen and adult cells expressing I antigen) has been observed in most primates, including chimpanzees and monkeys. This is not seen in non-primates: cats, dogs, or guinea pigs.
