= Mri1a =

Ant neurotoxin

Identifiers
- Organism: Manica rubida
- Symbol: N/A
- UniProt: A0A6G9KHE4
Search for
- Structures: Swiss-model
- Domains: InterPro

Mri1a is a toxin that comes from the venom of the Manica rubida ant. It modulates mammalian voltage-gated sodium channels in peripheral sensory neurons. causing a reduction in peak current amplitude and a hyperpolarizing shift of the voltage threshold. By increasing neuronal excitability in pain-sensing (nociceptive) neurons, Mri1a has a defensive role.

== Alternative names ==
Recommended: Delta-myrmicitoxin-Mri1a

Short: Delta-MYRTX-Mri1a

Alternative: U3-myrmicitoxin-Mri1a, U3-MYRTX-Mri1a, U3-MYTX-Mri1a

== Etymology ==
The toxin is named Mri1a, often cited as Delta-myrmicitoxin-Mri1a (or U3-myrmicitoxin-Mri1a, U3-MYRTX-Mri1a, and U3-MYTX-Mri1a) from the ant venom peptides. The “Mri” portion appears to refer to the ant species Manica rubida, and “1a” indicates that it is the first characterized peptide. Myrmicitoxin refers to venom of the ant subfamily Myrmicinae.

== Sources ==
This is a venom from the M.rubida (European red ant), usually found in sunny mountain areas in central and southern Europe. It has been identified as a vertebrate-selective defensive toxin.

== Chemistry ==
Mri1a belongs to the class of ant venom peptides that interact with the voltage-gated sodium (Nav) channels in vertebrates. It has a length of 104 amino acids with a mass of 2,174.27 Da. Mri1a shares sequence similarity with other ant-venom Nav peptides, such as EGF-like toxin. The peptide structure is most similar to the insect protein Spitz, a ligand for the insect receptor ErbB. This suggests that Mri1a is derived from the Spitz gene. Mri1a is part of the family group: poneratoxin (neurotoxin of the paraponera clavate), a peptide of 25 amino acids.

Amino acid sequence of Mri1a

  1 MEVPKFLFIA VIVIALSSSL 20 
 21 TWAHPMAAPD PNAEAAAGAW 40
 41 AEPAAEPAAE AVAEAAAEAA 60
 61 AEAAAEAVAE AVAEALAEAE 80
 81 SEPGLPLLAL LMTLPFIQHA 100
101 ITNG 108

== Target ==
Under experimental conditions, Mri1a targets the voltage-gated sodium channels Nav1.6 and Nav1.7. In vitro experiments show that Mri1a exhibited activity at Nav1.6 and at Nav1.7. The toxin displayed a higher sensitivity to Nav1.6 than to Nav1.7. The toxin did not show any significant effect on Nav1.8 and Nav1.9.

== Mode of action ==
Mri1a produces a hyperpolarizing shift in the voltage threshold of activation for Nav1.7, making it easier to open the channel. Mri1a reduces the peak current amplitude of Nav1.7 to around 68% of control in the experiment. It also induces a small, sustained current in Nav1.7.

In DRG (dorsal root ganglion) cultured neurons, application of Mri1a causes an increase of calcium concentration in ~52% of neurons, which fell to ~2.9% when sodium channels were blocked using tetrodotoxin (TTX), indicating that the increase in calcium concentration (and excitability) was due to the changes in the voltage-dependent activation of the TTX-sensitive voltage dependent channels caused by Mri1a.

== Toxicity ==
Injection of U3-MYRTX-Mri1a in mice induces dose-dependent nocifensive behaviours. In insects (Lucilia caesar) U3-MYRTX-Mri1a showed no noticeable toxin or insecticidal effects, indicating vertebrate selectivity.
