= Argos (EGFR Inhibitor) =

Protein found in Drosophila melanogaster

Protein giant-lens

Identifiers
- Organism: Drosophila melanogaster
- Symbol: Argos
- Alt. symbols: aos, gil, sty
- PDB: 3C9A
- RefSeq (mRNA): NM_079383.3
- RefSeq (Prot): NP_524107.2
- UniProt: Q00805
Search for
- Structures: Swiss-model
- Domains: InterPro

Argos is a secreted protein that is an inhibitor of the epidermal growth factor receptor (EGFR) pathway in Drosophila melanogaster. Argos inhibits the EGFR pathway by sequestering the EGFR ligand Spitz. Argos binds the epidermal growth factor domain of Spitz, preventing interaction between Spitz and EGFR. Argos does not directly interact with EGFR. Argos represents the first example of ligand sequestration as a mechanism of inhibition in the ErbB (EGFR) family.

== Function ==
Argos is secreted from cells in D. melanogaster. Outside the cell, it binds the EGFR-activator Spitz, preventing it from binding and activating EGFR. Drosophila with mutations that inactivate Argos have deformed eyes with extra photoreceptors and a small optic lobe due to disruption of EGFR's role in eye development. The name of the gene derives from the phenotype of mutant flies with eye defects and refers to Argus Panoptes.

== Structure ==
Crystallographic studies have revealed that Argos does not contain an EGF domain as originally expected. Rather, Argos is composed of 3 separate domains that have homology to one another, termed the Argos domain. The Argos domain has features in common with the three finger toxin fold that is found in a number of proteins including TGF beta receptors and the urokinase (uPA) receptor.

== See also ==
- EGFR inhibitor
