= UDP-D-xylose:beta-D-glucoside alpha-1,3-D-xylosyltransferase =

Class of enzymes

Identifiers
- EC no.: 2.4.2.42

Databases
- IntEnz: IntEnz view
- BRENDA: BRENDA entry
- ExPASy: NiceZyme view
- KEGG: KEGG entry
- MetaCyc: metabolic pathway
- PRIAM: profile
- PDB structures: RCSB PDB PDBe PDBsum
Search
- PMC: articles
- PubMed: articles
- NCBI: proteins

UDP-D-xylose:beta-D-glucoside alpha-1,3-D-xylosyltransferase (EC 2.4.2.42, beta-glucoside alpha-1,3-xylosyltransferase) is an enzyme with systematic name UDP-alpha-D-xylose:beta-D-glucoside 3-alpha-D-xylosyltransferase. This enzyme catalyses the following chemical reaction

UDP-alpha-D-xylose + Glcbeta-Ser53-EGF-like domain of bovine factor IX(45-87) $\rightleftharpoons$ UDP + Xylalpha(1-3)Glcbeta-Ser53-EGF-like domain of bovine factor IX(45-87)

The enzyme is involved in the biosynthesis of the Xylalpha(1-3)Xylalpha(1-3)Glcbeta-1-O-Ser on epidermal growth factor-like domains.
