= Andamertinib =

Investigational drug

Clinical data
- Other names: GTPL13732, PLB1004
- ATC code: None

Legal status
- Legal status: Rx in China

Identifiers
- IUPAC name: N-[4-Methoxy-2-[4-(3-methoxyazetidin-1-yl)piperidin-1-yl]-5-[[6-(1-methylindazol-5-yl)pyrimidin-4-yl]amino]phenyl]prop-2-enamide
- CAS Number: 2254145-43-0
- PubChem CID: 146498390
- IUPHAR/BPS: 13732
- UNII: 5X3KAG7ZBW

Chemical and physical data
- Formula: C_{31}H_{36}N_{8}O_{3}
- Molar mass: 568.682 g·mol^{−1}
- 3D model (JSmol): Interactive image
- SMILES: CN1C2=C(C=C(C=C2)C3=CC(=NC=N3)NC4=C(C=C(C(=C4)NC(=O)C=C)N5CCC(CC5)N6CC(C6)OC)OC)C=N1
- InChI: InChI=1S/C31H36N8O3/c1-5-31(40)36-25-13-26(29(42-4)15-28(25)38-10-8-22(9-11-38)39-17-23(18-39)41-3)35-30-14-24(32-19-33-30)20-6-7-27-21(12-20)16-34-37(27)2/h5-7,12-16,19,22-23H,1,8-11,17-18H2,2-4H3,(H,36,40)(H,32,33,35); Key:KKPCZGCBAIJCOU-UHFFFAOYSA-N

Andamertinib is pharmaceutical drug developed by Avistone Biotechnology for the treatment of non-small-cell lung cancer (NSCLC). It is an epidermal growth factor receptor (EGFR) antagonist. Andamertinib is an irreversible EGFR inhibitor designed to target EGFR with exon 20 insertion mutations.

== Use ==
In April 2026, andamertinib received conditional approval in China for adult patients with locally advanced or metastatic NSCLC who have experienced disease progression during or following platinum-based chemotherapy, or who are intolerant to platinum-based chemotherapy, and who have been confirmed by testing to have an EGFR exon 20 insertion mutation.

== Clinical trials ==
The following clinical trials are evaluating andamertinib for treating NSCLC:

- phase 2 (on going)
- phase 2 (on going) in combination wth vebreltinib or osimertinib
- phase 3 (recruiting) in combination with vebreltinib or pemetrexed plus carboplatin or cisplatin
