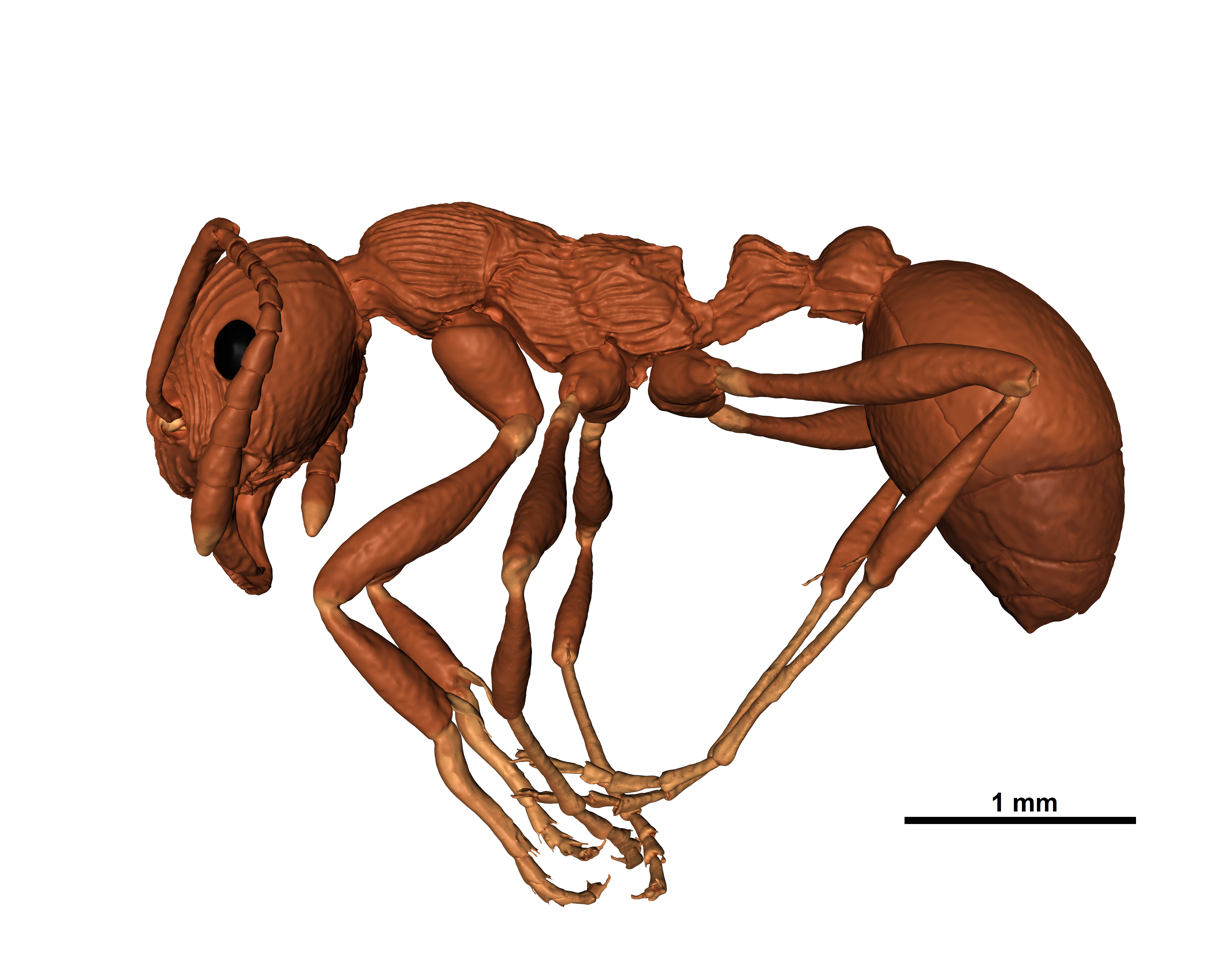
- Palaeontological reconstruction of†Manica andrannae

Scientific classification
- Kingdom: Animalia
- Phylum: Arthropoda
- Class: Insecta
- Order: Hymenoptera
- Family: Formicidae
- Subfamily: Myrmicinae
- Genus: Manica
- Species: M. andrannae

Binomial name
- Manica andrannae Zharkov et Dubovikoff, 2023

= Manica andrannae =

Species of fossil insect

Manica andrannae is a fossil species of the ants tribe Myrmicini from the subfamily Myrmicinae (Formicidae). It was discovered in Europe. Eocene amber has been dated at 33.9–37.8 million years ago (specifically Russian Baltic amber). This is the first finding of this genus in a fossil state, having a plesiomorphic state with features such as the propodeum having a weakly convex dorsum and short, blunt tubercles, and by a more angular petiolar node.
