= Epiregulin =

Protein found in humans

EREG
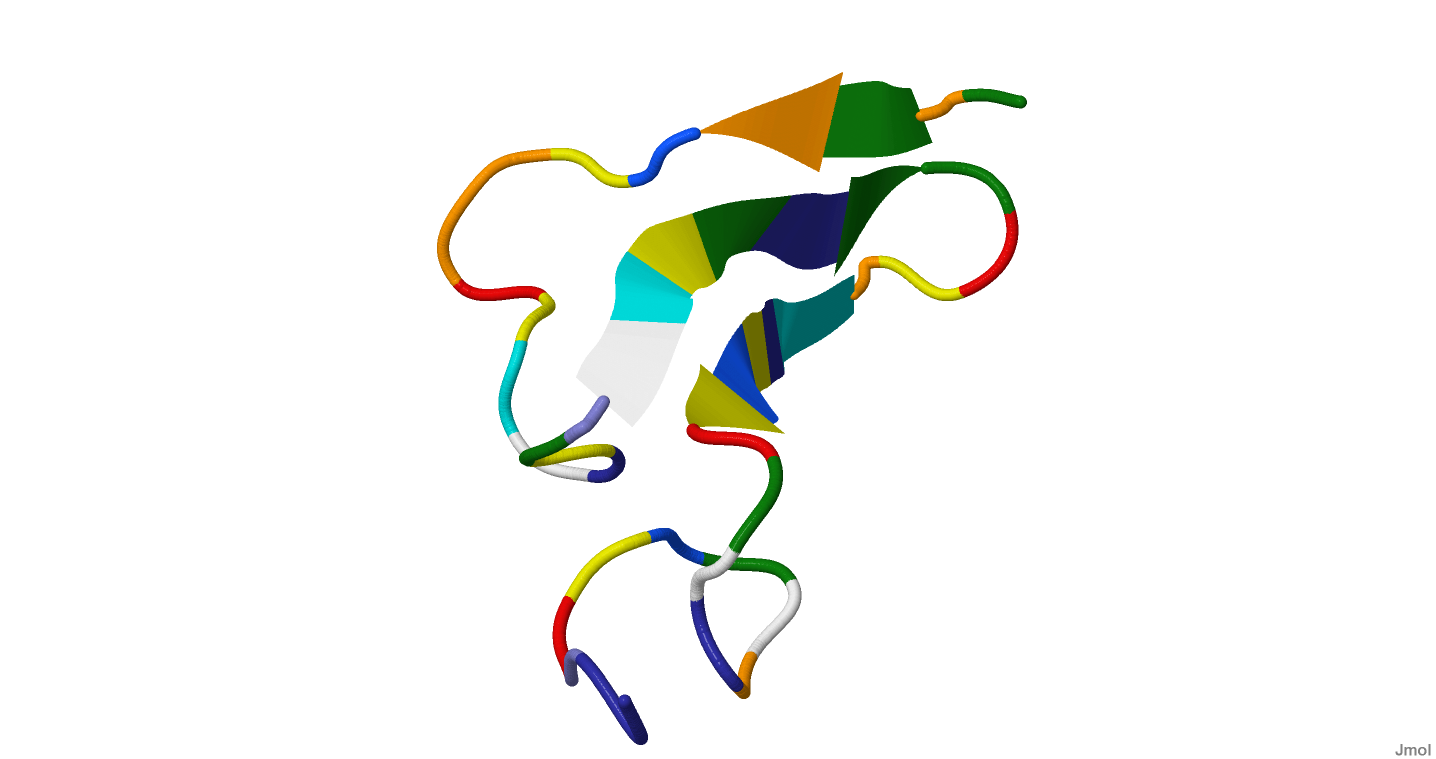

Identifiers
- Aliases: EREG, EPR, ER, Ep, epiregulin
- External IDs: OMIM: 602061; MGI: 107508; GeneCards: EREG
Available structures
PDB	Ortholog search: PDBe RCSB
PDB	List of PDB id codes 1K36, 1K37, 5E8D

Gene location (Human)
Chr.	Chromosome 4 (human)
Band	4q13.3	Start	74,365,145 bp
Band	4q13.3	End	74,388,749 bp

Gene location (Mouse)
Chr.	Chromosome 5 (mouse)
Band	5|5 E1	Start	91,222,481 bp
Band	5|5 E1	End	91,241,505 bp
RNA expression pattern
Bgee	Human / Mouse (ortholog); Top expressed in: buccal mucosa cell; amniotic fluid; skin of thigh; skin of arm; human penis; cervix epithelium; oral cavity; bone marrow cell; skin of abdomen; gums / Top expressed in: skin of external ear; conjunctival fornix; esophagus; umbilical cord; endothelial cell of lymphatic vessel; tunica media of zone of aorta; skin of back; ileum; cornea; epidermis; More reference expression data
BioGPS	n/a
Gene ontology
Molecular function	epidermal growth factor receptor binding; protein binding; growth factor activity; protein tyrosine kinase activity; phosphatidylinositol-4,5-bisphosphate 3-kinase activity
Cellular component	integral component of membrane; membrane; plasma membrane; integral component of plasma membrane; extracellular region; intracellular anatomical structure; extracellular space; clathrin-coated vesicle membrane
Biological process	luteinizing hormone signaling pathway; positive regulation of epidermal growth factor-activated receptor activity; cell differentiation; ovarian cumulus expansion; negative regulation of smooth muscle cell differentiation; positive regulation of cytokine production; cytokine-mediated signaling pathway; positive regulation of fibroblast proliferation; cell-cell signaling; anatomical structure morphogenesis; response to peptide hormone; wound healing; mRNA transcription; female meiotic nuclear division; primary follicle stage; keratinocyte differentiation; MAPK cascade; multicellular organism development; positive regulation of DNA replication; keratinocyte proliferation; oocyte maturation; angiogenesis; positive regulation of cell population proliferation; positive regulation of innate immune response; negative regulation of epithelial cell proliferation; animal organ morphogenesis; positive regulation of phosphorylation; negative regulation of transcription, DNA-templated; positive regulation of mitotic nuclear division; ovulation; positive regulation of cell division; negative regulation of cell population proliferation; positive regulation of smooth muscle cell proliferation; positive regulation of protein kinase activity; ERBB2 signaling pathway; regulation of cell motility; epidermal growth factor receptor signaling pathway; peptidyl-tyrosine phosphorylation; phosphatidylinositol phosphate biosynthetic process; positive regulation of protein kinase B signaling; signal transduction; negative regulation of epidermal growth factor receptor signaling pathway; membrane organization
Sources:Amigo / QuickGO
Orthologs
Databases	NCBI: entry; OMA: entry
Species	Human	Mouse
Entrez	2069	13874
Ensembl	ENSG00000124882	ENSMUSG00000029377
UniProt	O14944	Q61521
RefSeq (mRNA)	NM_001432	NM_007950
RefSeq (protein)	NP_001423	NP_031976
Location (UCSC)	Chr 4: 74.37 – 74.39 Mb	Chr 5: 91.22 – 91.24 Mb
PubMed search
- Wikidata
View/Edit Human	View/Edit Mouse

Epiregulin (EPR) is a protein that in humans is encoded by the EREG gene.

== Structure ==
Epiregulin consists of 46 amino acid residues. Its secondary structure contains approximately 30 percent of β-sheet in the strand. Some of the residues form loops and turns due to the hydrogen bonding. The percentage of β-sheet in epiregulin depends on the domain and the secondary structures that they occupy. The polymeric molecules of epiregulin has the formula weight of 5280.1 g/mol with a polypeptide(L), a polymer type.

Structural motifs in most proteins have typical connections in an all β motif. Meaning that the polypeptide chains do not make a crossover connection or in so far as this type of connection has not been observed. Epiregulin is one of the proteins that occupies a typical connection in all β motif. Furthermore, as the structure of epiregulin forms a chain in an all β motif, it also forms β hairpin structural motif. A β hairpin is when the two adjacent anti-parallel β strands connected by a β-turn.

== Function ==
Epiregulin is a member of the epidermal growth factor family. Epiregulin can function as a ligand of epidermal growth factor receptor (EGFR), as well as a ligand of most members of the ERBB (v-erb-b2 oncogene homolog) family of tyrosine-kinase receptors. The secondary structure at the C-terminus epiregulin is different from other epidermal growth factor family ligands because of the lack of hydrogen bonds. The structural difference at the C-terminus may provide an explanation for the reduced binding affinity of epiregulin to the ERBB receptors.
