= Zorifertinib =

Clinical data
- Other names: AZD3759

Legal status
- Legal status: Rx in China

Identifiers
- IUPAC name: [4-(3-Chloro-2-fluoroanilino)-7-methoxyquinazolin-6-yl] (2R)-2,4-dimethylpiperazine-1-carboxylate
- CAS Number: 1626387-80-1
- PubChem CID: 78209992
- IUPHAR/BPS: 10456
- DrugBank: DB14795
- ChemSpider: 38772332
- UNII: 67SX9H68W2
- ChEMBL: ChEMBL3623290

Chemical and physical data
- Formula: C_{22}H_{23}ClFN_{5}O_{3}
- Molar mass: 459.91 g·mol^{−1}
- 3D model (JSmol): Interactive image
- SMILES: C[C@@H]1CN(CCN1C(=O)OC2=C(C=C3C(=C2)C(=NC=N3)NC4=C(C(=CC=C4)Cl)F)OC)C
- InChI: InChI=1S/C22H23ClFN5O3/c1-13-11-28(2)7-8-29(13)22(30)32-19-9-14-17(10-18(19)31-3)25-12-26-21(14)27-16-6-4-5-15(23)20(16)24/h4-6,9-10,12-13H,7-8,11H2,1-3H3,(H,25,26,27)/t13-/m1/s1; Key:MXDSJQHFFDGFDK-CYBMUJFWSA-N

Zorifertinib (AZD3759) is a drug for the treatment of cancer. In China, it was approved in 2024 for locally advanced or metastatic non-small-cell lung cancer (NSCLC) that has epidermal growth factor receptor exon 19 deletion or exon 21 L858R substitution mutations and central nervous system (CNS) metastases.
