= Matuzumab =

Monoclonal antibody

Monoclonal antibody
- Type: Whole antibody
- Source: Humanized
- Target: EGFR

Clinical data
- ATC code: none

Legal status
- Legal status: clinical development failed

Pharmacokinetic data
- Bioavailability: N/A

Identifiers
- CAS Number: 339186-68-4
- ChemSpider: none
- UNII: MG4M3QB242

Matuzumab (formerly EMD 72000) is a humanized monoclonal antibody for the treatment of cancer. It binds to the epidermal growth factor receptor (EGFR) with high affinity. The mouse monoclonal antibody (mAb425) from which matuzumab was developed at the Wistar Institute in Philadelphia, Pennsylvania

Produced and developed by Merck Serono in cooperation with Takeda Pharmaceutical, it has undergone phase II clinical trials for the treatment of colorectal, lung, esophageal and stomach cancer early in the 2000s. In August 2007, Merck Serono announced that the preliminary results of the colorectal cancer study were less than promising, and that further trials for treating this type of cancer may be abandoned. In February 2008, the development was halted because of disappointing study results.

== Mechanism of action ==
Matuzumab binds to epidermal growth factor receptor (EGFR) on the outer membrane of normal and tumor cells. The matuzumab epitope has been mapped to domain III of the extracellular domain of the EGFR. The EGFR is receptor tyrosine kinase which binds multiple growth factors including EGF (epidermal growth factor) and other members of the EGF family of growth factors, resulting in activation of its tyrosine kinase activity. Activation of the EGFR has diverse effects on target cells depending on cell type and tissue context. It directs cell fate decision relating to cell growth, survival and, differentiation. Development of matuzumab and other antibodies to the EGFR (for example cetuximab) as cancer therapeutics was motivated by observations that EGFR expression and/or signaling is frequently upregulated in cancer cells.

== Preclinical and Clinical testing ==
After determining the pharmacokinetic characteristics in a phase I study, several phase II studies investigating the treatment of advanced stomach carcinoma were conducted. At the conference of the American Society of Clinical Oncology (ASCO) in May 2005, the following results from clinical phase II studies with matuzumab were presented:

=== Advanced non-smallcellular lung carcinoma ===
Mutations in the kinase domain of the EGFR are observed with approximately 2 to 25% of non-small cell lung carcinoma (NSCLC) patients. Some studies have shown a negative correlation between the effectiveness of EGFR tyrosine kinase inhibitors and such mutations. The effect of matuzumab (in combination with paclitaxel) does not seem to be dependent on these mutations.

=== Advanced adenocarcinomas of stomach and esophagus ===
Results of two studies regarding adenocarcinomas have shown matuzumab to be well tolerated in combination with two standard chemotherapies – cisplatin, 5-fluorouracil and leucovorin (PFL) as well as epirubicin, cisplatin and capecitabine (ECX) – as a first line therapy. Rates of response were up to 53% with a combination of matuzumab and ECX.

On August 27, 2007, Merck announced that matuzumab will not be used for intestinal cancer due to negative results in phase II studies.

== Discontinuation of development ==
No further clinical trials have been conducted since the phase I trial in 2007. On February 18, 2008, Takeda and Merck announced that they would no longer pursue the development of the drug.
