= Betacellulin =

Protein-coding gene in humans

BTC

Identifiers
- Aliases: BTC, entrez:685, betacellulin
- External IDs: OMIM: 600345; MGI: 99439; GeneCards: BTC
Available structures
PDB	Ortholog search: PDBe RCSB
PDB	List of PDB id codes 1IOX, 1IP0

Gene location (Human)
Chr.	Chromosome 4 (human)
Band	4q13.3	Start	74,744,759 bp
Band	4q13.3	End	74,794,523 bp

Gene location (Mouse)
Chr.	Chromosome 5 (mouse)
Band	5 E2|5 44.78 cM	Start	91,505,120 bp
Band	5 E2|5 44.78 cM	End	91,550,853 bp
RNA expression pattern
Bgee	Human / Mouse (ortholog); Top expressed in: muscle layer of sigmoid colon; skin of thigh; skin of hip; gastric mucosa; Descending thoracic aorta; olfactory zone of nasal mucosa; bronchial epithelial cell; mucosa of paranasal sinus; ascending aorta; retinal pigment epithelium / Top expressed in: female external genitalia; mucous cell of stomach; glans of clitoris; pyloric antrum; epithelium of stomach; tunica media of zone of aorta; medullary collecting duct; skin of back; retinal pigment epithelium; right kidney; More reference expression data
BioGPS	n/a
Gene ontology
Molecular function	protein binding; phosphatidylinositol-4,5-bisphosphate 3-kinase activity; protein tyrosine kinase activity; epidermal growth factor receptor binding; growth factor activity
Cellular component	integral component of membrane; membrane; plasma membrane; extracellular region; intracellular anatomical structure; extracellular space; clathrin-coated vesicle membrane
Biological process	positive regulation of urine volume; positive regulation of fibroblast proliferation; negative regulation of apoptotic process; MAPK cascade; positive regulation of cell differentiation; positive regulation of cell population proliferation; positive regulation of mitotic nuclear division; positive regulation of cell division; regulation of cell motility; phosphatidylinositol phosphate biosynthetic process; epidermal growth factor receptor signaling pathway; ERBB2 signaling pathway; peptidyl-tyrosine phosphorylation; regulation of signaling receptor activity; positive regulation of protein kinase B signaling; signal transduction; negative regulation of epidermal growth factor receptor signaling pathway; membrane organization
Sources:Amigo / QuickGO
Orthologs
Databases	NCBI: entry; OMA: entry
Species	Human	Mouse
Entrez	685	12223
Ensembl	ENSG00000174808	ENSMUSG00000082361
UniProt	P35070	Q05928
RefSeq (mRNA)	NM_001729; NM_001316963	NM_007568
RefSeq (protein)	NP_001303892; NP_001720	NP_031594
Location (UCSC)	Chr 4: 74.74 – 74.79 Mb	Chr 5: 91.51 – 91.55 Mb
PubMed search
- Wikidata
View/Edit Human	View/Edit Mouse

Betacellulin is a protein that in humans is encoded by the BTC gene located on chromosome 4 at locus 4q13-q21. Betacellulin was initially identified as a mitogen. Betacellulin, is a part of an Epidermal Growth Factor (EGF) family and functions as a ligand for the epidermal growth factor receptor (EGFR). The role of betacellulin as an EGF is manifested differently in various tissues, and it has a great effect on nitrogen signaling in retinal pigment epithelial cells and vascular smooth muscle cells. While many studies attest a role for betacellulin in the differentiation of pancreatic β-cells, the last decade witnessed the association of betacellulin with many additional biological processes, ranging from reproduction to the control of neural stem cells. Betacellulin is a member of the EGF family of growth factors. It is synthesized primarily as a transmembrane precursor, which is then processed to mature molecule by proteolytic events.

== Structure ==
As shown on figure 1, the secondary structure of the human betacellulin-2 has 6% helical (1 helices; 3 residues) 36% beta sheet (5 strands; 18 residues). The mRNA of betacellulin contains six exons in which is 2816 base-pair long. The mRNA was translated into 178 amino acids, and different regions of the amino acid are responsible for different function. The first 31 amino acids are responsible for the signal peptide (Figure 2, exon 1), the 32nd to 118th amino acids are responsible for the extracellular region (Figure 2, exon 2 and 3), the 65-105 amino acids are responsible for the EGF-like domain (Figure 2, exon 3), the transmembrane domain is from amino acids 119-139 (Figure 2, exon 4), the cytoplasmic tail is from amino acid 140-178 (Figure 2, exon 5).

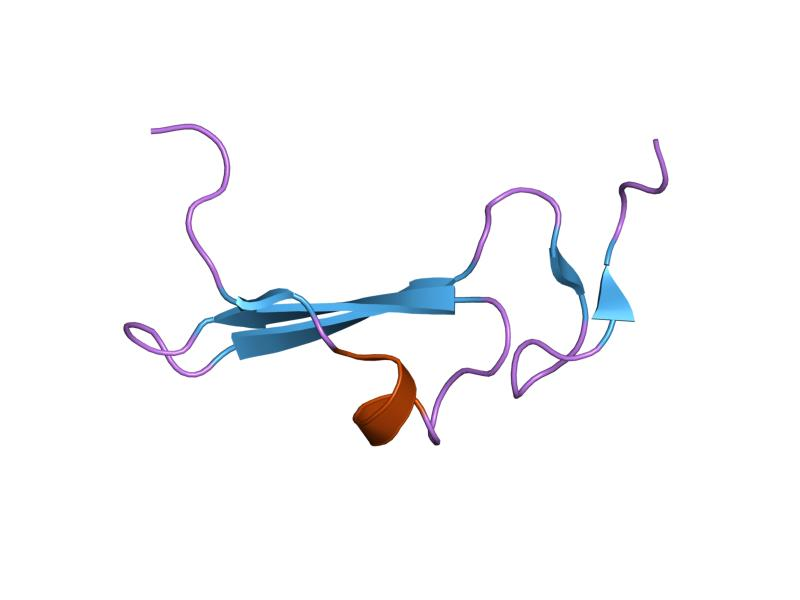
Figure 1. NMR Structure of Human Betacellulin-2

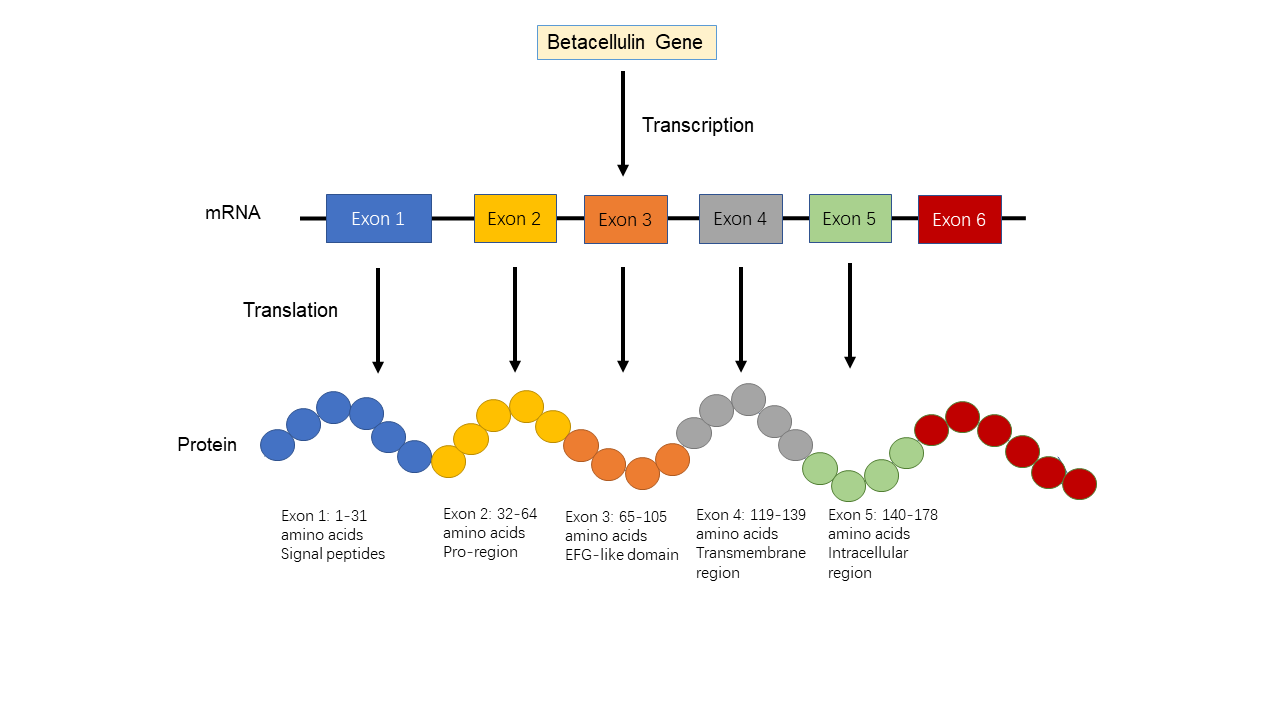
Figure 2. The transcription and translation product of betacellulin gene

== Function ==
As a typical EGFR ligand, betacellulin is expressed by a variety of cell types and tissues, the post-translation of the betacellulin can ectodomain shedding, and the proteolytic release the soluble factors can bind and activate the homodimer or heterodimer of the ERBB receptors. The membrane-anchored form of the betacellulin can activate the epidermal growth factor receptor (EGFR). Betacellulin stimulates the proliferation of retinal pigment epithelial and vascular smooth muscle cells but did not stimulate the growth of several other cell types, such as endothelial cells and fetal lung fibroblasts.

== Tissue distribution ==
The mRNA coding for betacellulin was found to be slightly higher compared in the rat sciatic nerve segment after nerve damage, suggesting that betacellulin can play a role in peripheral nerve regeneration. Immunohistochemistry has been used to look for betacellulin expression in Schwann cells. Treating cells with betacellulin recombinant protein can be used to investigate the role of betacellulin in managing Schwann cells. A co-culture assay can also used to assess the effect of Schwann cell-secreted betacellulin on neurons.

Mouse BTC is expressed as a 178-amino acid precursor. The membrane-bound precursor is cleaved to yield mature secreted mouse BTC. BTC is synthesized in a wide range of adult tissues and in many cultured cells, including smooth muscle cells and epithelial cells. The amino acid sequence of mature mouse BTC is 82.5%, identical with that of human BTC, and both exhibit significant overall similarity with other members of the EGF family.

== Clinical significance ==
The transcription factor signal transducer and activator of transcription 3 (STAT3) was identified as the therapeutic target for glioblastoma.
