= Zalutumumab =

Monoclonal antibody

Monoclonal antibody
- Type: Whole antibody
- Source: Human
- Target: Epidermal growth factor receptor

Clinical data
- ATC code: none

Identifiers
- CAS Number: 667901-13-5
- ChemSpider: none
- UNII: DA709Q5020
- KEGG: D10031

Chemical and physical data
- Formula: C_{6512}H_{10074}N_{1734}O_{2032}S_{46}
- Molar mass: 146643.09 g·mol^{−1}

Zalutumumab (proposed trade name HuMax-EGFR) is a fully human IgG1 monoclonal antibody (mAb) directed towards the epidermal growth factor receptor (EGFR). It is a product developed by Genmab in Utrecht, the Netherlands. Specifically, zalutumumab is designed for the treatment of squamous cell carcinoma of the head and neck (SCCHN), a type of cancer.

== Mechanism of action ==
Zalutumumab works through inhibition of the EGFR signal. The EGFR is a receptor tyrosine kinase. Its structure includes an extracellular binding domain, a transmembrane lipophilic segment, and an intracellular tyrosine kinase domain.

=== Mechanism of EGFR ===
EGFR is over-expressed by many tumor cells. Upon binding by a ligand, such as the epidermal growth factor or TGF alpha, dimerization occurs, leading to autophosphorylation on the intracellular tyrosine residues. Following phosphorylation, the Grb2-SOS signaling complex is stimulated. This causes the activation of the G protein RAS through the exchange of guanosine diphosphate (GDP) for guanosine triphosphate (GTP). The exchange of GDP for GTP induces a conformational change of RAS to allow it to bind to Raf-1. Raf-1 is then activated through another multistep mechanism in which dephosphorylation of inhibitory sites by protein phosphatase 2A (PP2A), as well as the phosphorylation of activating sites by p21 activated kinase (PAK) occurs. After this, Raf-1 activates MAPK/ERK kinase (MEK), which then goes on to activate extracellular-signal-regulated kinase (ERK). ERK is then able to enter the cell nucleus and control gene expression by phosphorylating various transcription factors, such as Elk-1. It is from there that the specific gene transcription occurs to initiate the cell cycle. Through this mechanism, apoptosis is inhibited, angiogenesis, migration, adhesion, and invasion occur. Each of these is a functional element to the progression and development of cancer, which is defined as an abnormal growth of cells with a tendency to proliferate in an uncontrolled way and, in some cases, to metastasize.

== Developmental status ==
2009: Zalutumumab treatment was approved for Fast Track status by the U.S. Food and Drug Administration for patients suffering from SCCHN who have failed standard therapies and have no other options. The drug has undergone pre-clinical and Phase I and II studies and is also in Phases I and II for SCCHN front-line with chemo-radiation and SCCHN with radiation. Additionally, a Phase II is under way for SCCHN and Phase III studies are also being performed for SCCHN and SCCHN front-line with radio therapy.

2010:A phase III study (of zalutumumab as an addition to 'best supportive care' in patients after failed standard platinum-based chemotherapy) reported a non-significant improvement in overall survival, and a significant 61% improvement in Progression-free survival

2014:A study of zalutumumab as addition to chemoradiation for SCCHN showed no benefit, and 94% developed a skin rash (11% severe enough to discontinue).

2015:Genmab not proceeding with zalutumumab.
