= Epigen =

Protein-coding gene in the species Homo sapiens

EPGN

Identifiers
- Aliases: EPGN, ALGV3072, EPG, PRO9904, epithelial mitogen
- External IDs: MGI: 1919170; GeneCards: EPGN

Gene location (Human)
Chr.	Chromosome 4 (human)
Band	4q13.3	Start	74,308,470 bp
Band	4q13.3	End	74,316,789 bp

Gene location (Mouse)
Chr.	Chromosome 5 (mouse)
Band	5|5 E1	Start	91,175,323 bp
Band	5|5 E1	End	91,183,074 bp
RNA expression pattern
Bgee	Human / Mouse (ortholog); Top expressed in: mucosa of esophagus; vagina; skin of leg; appendix; skin of abdomen; right lung; tonsil; bone marrow cell; ectocervix; mucosa of transverse colon / Top expressed in: embryo; cornea; embryo; hair follicle; spermatid; lip; skin of abdomen; conjunctival fornix; skin of back; muscle of thigh; More reference expression data
BioGPS	n/a
Gene ontology
Molecular function	epidermal growth factor receptor binding; growth factor activity
Cellular component	integral component of membrane; extracellular region; integral component of plasma membrane; intracellular anatomical structure; membrane; extracellular space; clathrin-coated vesicle membrane
Biological process	positive regulation of epidermal growth factor-activated receptor activity; positive regulation of mitotic nuclear division; positive regulation of MAP kinase activity; angiogenesis; positive regulation of cell population proliferation; MAPK cascade; positive regulation of epithelial cell proliferation; epidermal growth factor receptor signaling pathway; signal transduction; negative regulation of epidermal growth factor receptor signaling pathway; positive regulation of protein kinase B signaling; membrane organization
Sources:Amigo / QuickGO
Orthologs
Databases	NCBI: entry; OMA: entry
Species	Human	Mouse
Entrez	255324	71920
Ensembl	ENSG00000182585	ENSMUSG00000035020
UniProt	Q6UW88	Q924X1
RefSeq (mRNA)	NM_001013442; NM_001270989; NM_001270990; NM_001270991; NM_001270992 NM_001270993	NM_053087
RefSeq (protein)	NP_001257918; NP_001257919; NP_001257920; NP_001257921; NP_001257922	NP_444317
Location (UCSC)	Chr 4: 74.31 – 74.32 Mb	Chr 5: 91.18 – 91.18 Mb
PubMed search
- Wikidata
View/Edit Human	View/Edit Mouse

Epigen also known as epithelial mitogen is a protein that in humans is encoded by the EPGN gene.

== Function ==
The protein encoded by this gene is a member of the epidermal growth factor family. Members of this family are ligands for the epidermal growth factor receptor and play a role in cell survival, proliferation and migration. This protein has been reported to have high mitogenic activity but low affinity for its receptor. Expression of this transcript and protein have been reported in cancer specimens of the breast, bladder, and prostate.
