= Veristrat =

VeriStrat is a test developed to evaluate patient prognosis and, additionally, predict benefit from cancer treatment by EGFR inhibitors. It is a serum/plasma proteomic test developed using matrix-assisted laser desorption/ionization (MALDI) mass spectrometry. VeriStrat was developed by Biodesix, Inc., a molecular diagnostics company based in Boulder, Colorado, US.

The VeriStrat algorithm has been interrogated retrospectively and prospectively in samples from randomized trials, such as the PROSE study, confirming the prognostic information associated with the molecular signature. In addition, the test appeared to be predictive of erlotinib impact on survival, as only "VeriStrat Good patients" benefited from such a treatment. Additional studies have confirmed its clinical relevance.
