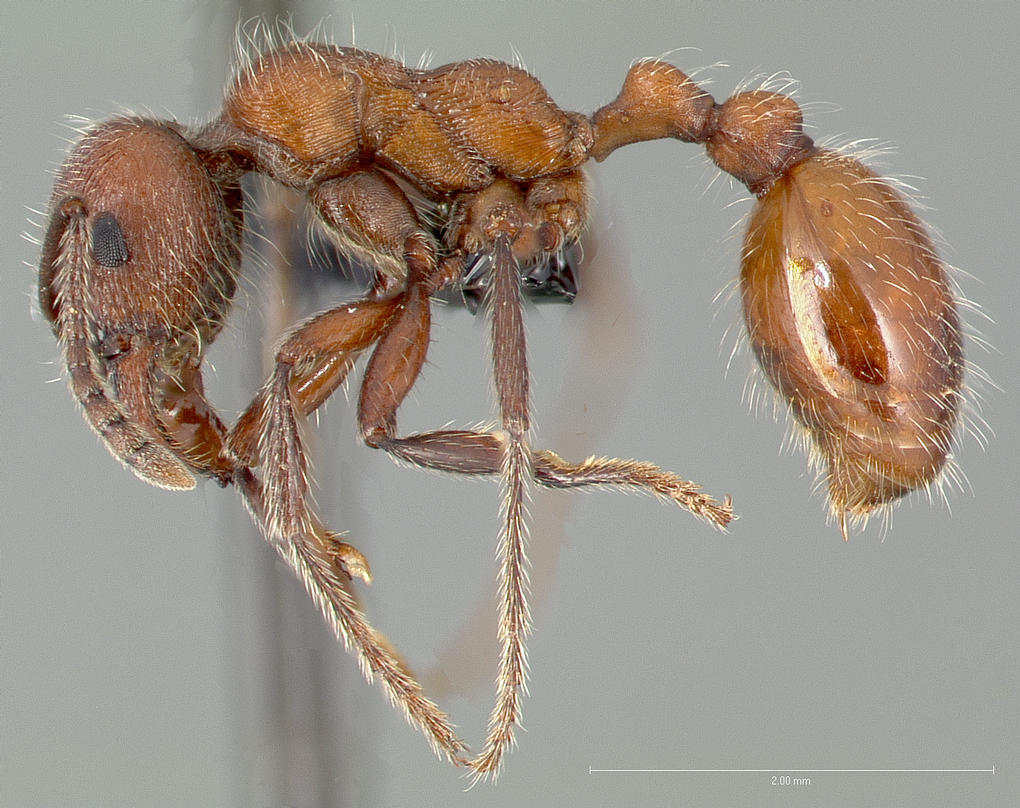

Scientific classification
- Domain: Eukaryota
- Kingdom: Animalia
- Phylum: Arthropoda
- Class: Insecta
- Order: Hymenoptera
- Family: Formicidae
- Subfamily: Myrmicinae
- Genus: Manica
- Species: M. invidia

Binomial name
- Manica invidia Bolton, 1995

= Manica invidia =

Species of ant

Manica invidia is a species of ant in the family Formicidae.
