= Firmonertinib =

Clinical data
- Other names: Alflutinib mesylate; AST-2818; Furmonertinib; Furmonertinib mesylate; Iflutinib mesylate; Ivesa; Vometinib mesylate

Legal status
- Legal status: investigational

Identifiers
- IUPAC name: N-[2-[2-(dimethylamino)ethyl-methylamino]-5-[[4-(1-methylindol-3-yl)pyrimidin-2-yl]amino]-6-(2,2,2-trifluoroethoxy)-3-pyridinyl]prop-2-enamide
- CAS Number: 1869057-83-9
- PubChem CID: 118861389
- IUPHAR/BPS: 10477
- DrugBank: DB16087
- ChemSpider: 81367235
- UNII: A49A7A5YN4
- KEGG: D12956
- ChEBI: CHEBI:756763
- ChEMBL: ChEMBL4297258

Chemical and physical data
- Formula: C_{28}H_{31}F_{3}N_{8}O_{2}
- Molar mass: 568.605 g·mol^{−1}
- 3D model (JSmol): Interactive image
- SMILES: CN1C=C(C2=CC=CC=C21)C3=NC(=NC=C3)NC4=C(N=C(C(=C4)NC(=O)C=C)N(C)CCN(C)C)OCC(F)(F)F
- InChI: InChI=InChI=1S/C28H31F3N8O2/c1-6-24(40)33-21-15-22(26(41-17-28(29,30)31)36-25(21)38(4)14-13-37(2)3)35-27-32-12-11-20(34-27)19-16-39(5)23-10-8-7-9-18(19)23/h6-12,15-16H,1,13-14,17H2,2-5H3,(H,33,40)(H,32,34,35); Key:GHKOONMJXNWOIW-UHFFFAOYSA-N

Firmonertinib (previously referred to as alflutinib and furmonertinib) is targeted drug that that is approved in China for the treatment of non-small cell lung cancer (NSCLC). The originator of the drug was Shanghai Allist Pharmaceuticals. It is now being developed outside China through a licensing deal with ArriVent BioPharma, Inc. for the same indication. It is a epidermal growth factor receptor (EGFR) antagonist.

== Pharmacology ==
Firmonertinib is an EGFR inhibitor that binds irreversibly through a chemical reactive acrylamide to the Cys-797 residue of the ATP-binding site of EGFR via a Michael addition to form a covalent bond. It has binding selectivity for T790M mutant over wild‑type EGFR.

== Clinical trials ==
Firmonertinib is currently in phase 3 clinical trials in North America, Europe, and Asia for non-small cell lung cancer in the.

== Approvals ==
It was approved for use in China in 2021 in NSCLC patients with confirmed EGFR T790M mutations.
