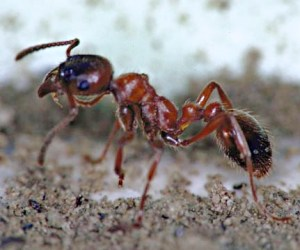
- Manica rubida

Scientific classification
- Kingdom: Animalia
- Phylum: Arthropoda
- Class: Insecta
- Order: Hymenoptera
- Family: Formicidae
- Subfamily: Myrmicinae
- Tribe: Myrmicini
- Genus: Manica; Latreille, 1804

Type species
- Formica rubida Latreille, 1802

Diversity
- 7 species

Synonyms
- Neomyrma Forel, 1914; Oreomyrma Wheeler, W.M., 1914

= Manica (ant) =

Genus of ants

Manica is a genus of ants within the subfamily Myrmicinae. To date it contains seven known species.

== Species ==
- M. bradleyi Wheeler, 1909
- M. hunteri Wheeler, 1914
- M. invidia Bolton, 1995
- M. parasitica Creighton, 1934
- M. rubida Latreille, 1802
- M. yessensis Azuma, 1973
- †M. andrannae Zharkov et Duboviloff, 2023
