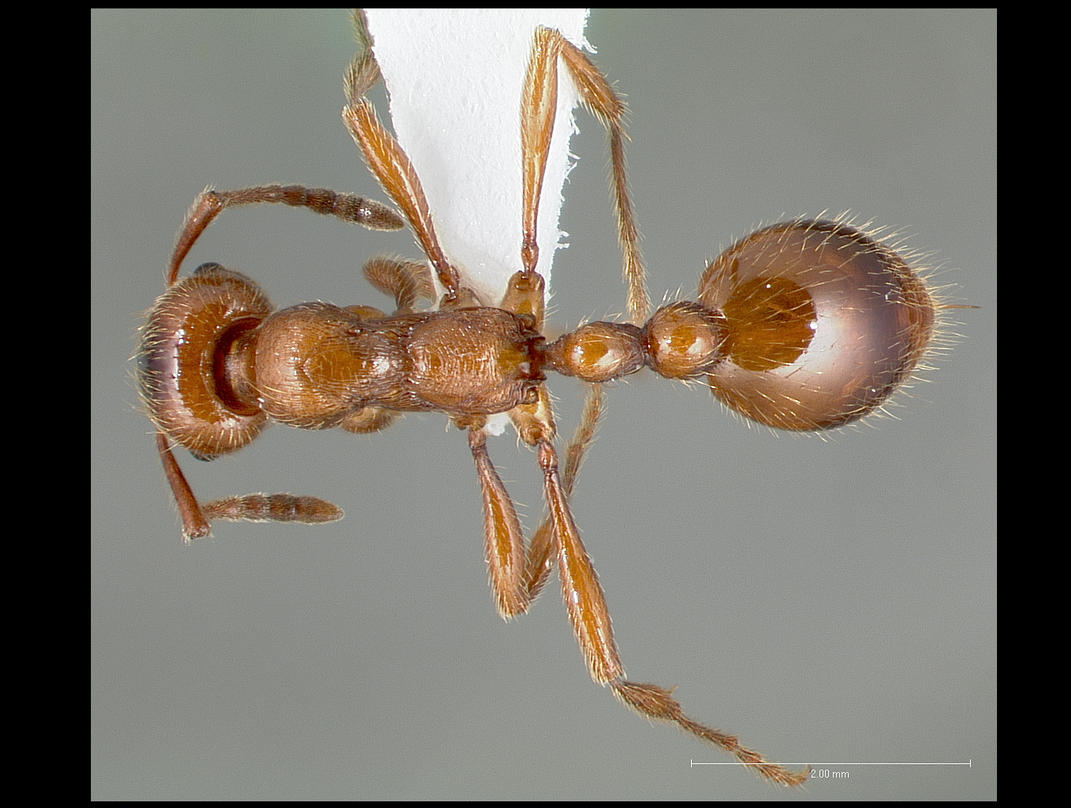

Scientific classification
- Kingdom: Animalia
- Phylum: Arthropoda
- Clade: Pancrustacea
- Class: Insecta
- Order: Hymenoptera
- Family: Formicidae
- Subfamily: Myrmicinae
- Genus: Manica
- Species: M. hunteri

Binomial name
- Manica hunteri (Wheeler, 1914)

= Manica hunteri =

Species of ant

Manica hunteri is a species of ant in the family Formicidae.

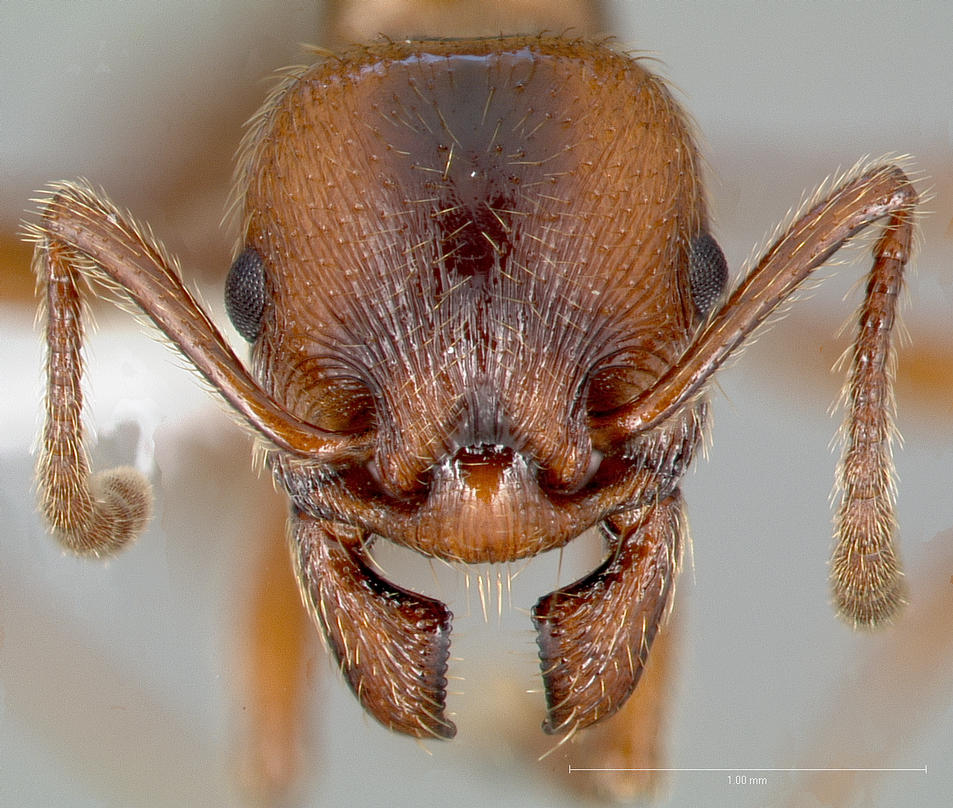

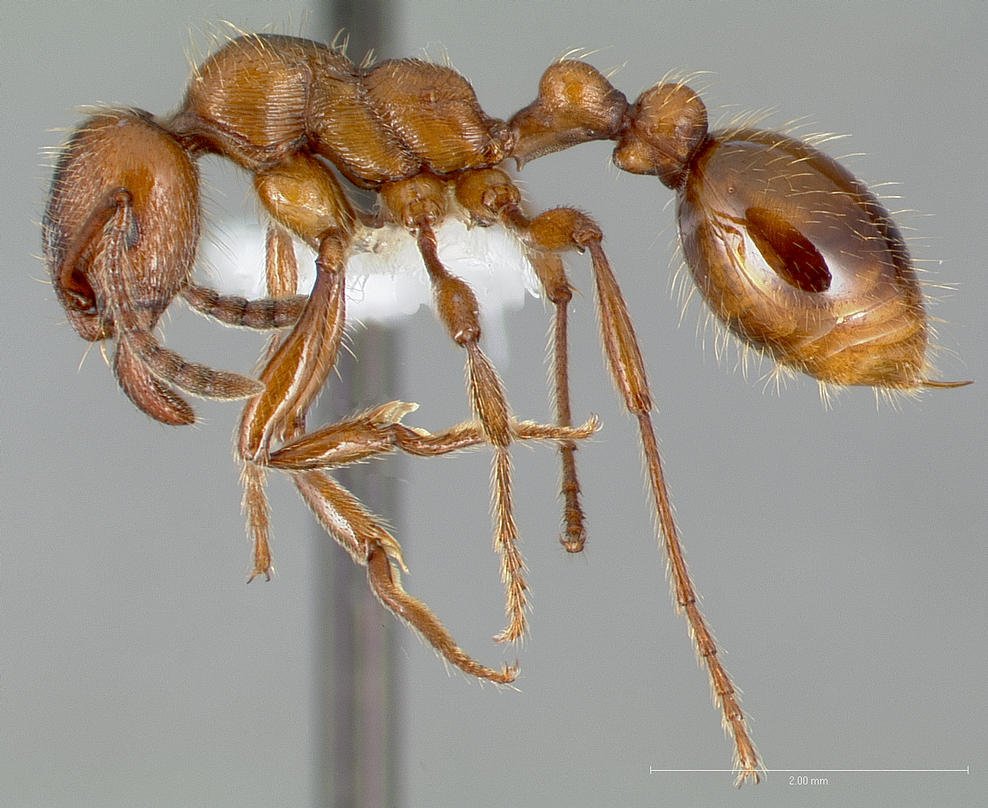
