= Faint little ball =

Drosophila gene

Epidermal growth factor receptor

Identifiers
- Organism: Drosophila melanogaster
- Symbol: Egfr
- Alt. symbols: flb
- UniProt: P04412
Search for
- Structures: Swiss-model
- Domains: InterPro

Faint little ball (flb) is a Drosophila gene that encodes the Drosophila epidermal growth factor receptor (DER) homolog. The gene is also called torpedo and Ellipse. The gene is located at 3-26 of the Drosophila melanogaster genome. It is named faint little ball because when the gene is mutated the embryo forms a ball of dorsal hypoderm. flb is necessary for several processes to occur during embryonic development, specifically in central nervous system development. It is expressed as quickly as 4 hours after fertilization of the egg. The peak of expression of the flb gene is between 4–8 hours into development. In all processes that are facilitated by flb the same signal transduction pathway is used. Drosophila EGF receptor is involved in the development of embryos as well as larvae/pupae's wings, eyes, legs and ovaries.

== Interactions ==
Whether looking at development in embryos or larvae/pupae, DER relies on several ligands to carry out its function. These are called SPITZ, ARGOS and Gurken. The efficiency of DER corresponds with the sum of these three ligands. As of yet the exact purpose of these ligands in the pathway of DER is unknown, but when expression of these ligands is altered from normal, aberrant phenotypes of the embryos can be observed. When DER is over utilized in the cell because of increases in ligand, phenotypic abnormalities can be visualized such as hyperplasia of the head midline structures. The flb gene also has interactions with the proteins Rhomboid and Star. Rhomboid is a protease that cleaves ligands such as Spitz so that they can come into contact with receptors such as DER and begin activate a signal transduction pathway.

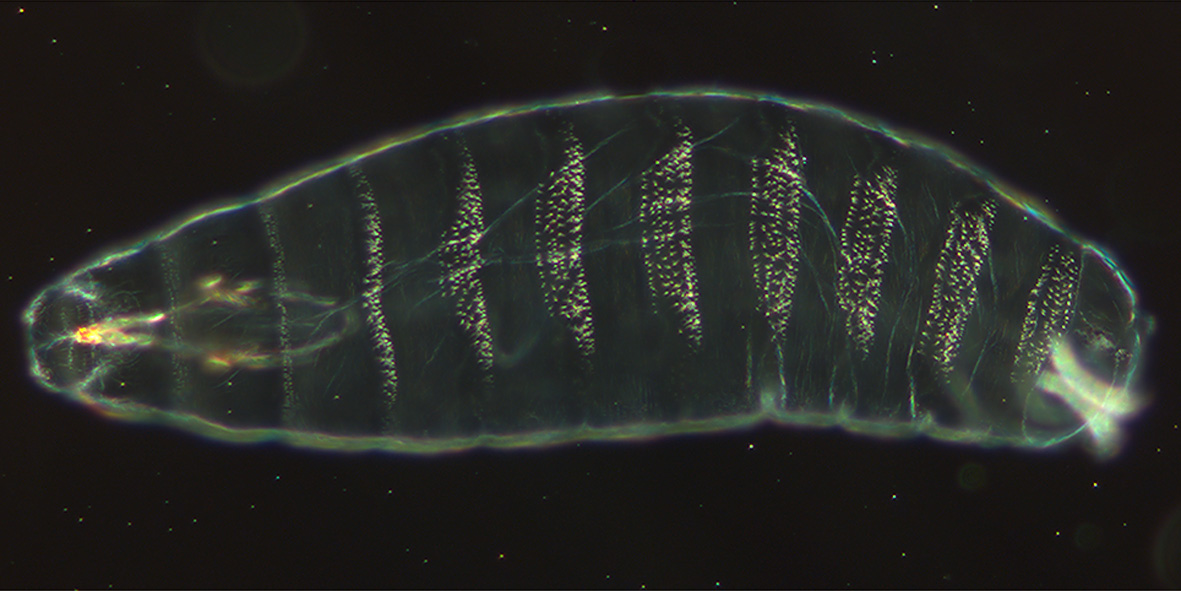
The dentricle belts are visible during the development of Drosophila melanogaster. Drosophila EGF receptor homolog plays a role in the correct development of these dentricle belts.

== Function ==
Expression of the flb gene can be seen as early as four hours into the development of Drosophila melanogaster. At four hours the gene is facilitating the retraction of the germ band as well as structuring the beginnings of the CNS. At six hours the gene is used to differentiate epidermal cells to secrete denticle belts which begin segmentation of the larva. At nine hours the gene is used for the differentiation of midline glial cells. When this gene is mutated or any of its interactions are altered phenotypes such as fused commissures can be seen as a result of improper segregation.

== Mutation ==
When the flb gene is mutated, several phenotypic abnormalities during development can be viewed. The first is that the embryo will form a ball of dorsal hypoderm. This is because flb is responsible for the formation of the ventral cuticle. Without the complete formation of the ventral cuticle only dorsal structures will be present. Since flb plays a role in the formation of the CNS and the eye, head structures will be underdeveloped or not present at all. Another function of the gene is to retract the germ band. This will not occur if the flb is mutated. There are other hypomorphic alleles that also contribute to the retraction of the germ-band, which allow for a spectrum of severity in the phenotype of embryos but they will not recover the Wild Type phenotype completely. This gene is necessary for the development of embryos and if it is not expressed in the appropriate way, it is lethal to the embryo.
