= Silevertinib =

Investigational drug

Clinical data
- Other names: RVU-120

Identifiers
- IUPAC name: (E)-N-[4-(3-chloro-2-fluoroanilino)-7-[2-[(1R,5S)-3-methyl-3-azabicyclo[3.1.0]hexan-1-yl]ethynyl]quinazolin-6-yl]-4-morpholin-4-ylbut-2-enamide
- CAS Number: 2607829-38-7
- PubChem CID: 156071569
- IUPHAR/BPS: 13371
- UNII: RP9F537KVY
- KEGG: D13300

Chemical and physical data
- Formula: C_{30}H_{30}ClFN_{6}O_{2}
- Molar mass: 561.06 g·mol^{−1}
- 3D model (JSmol): Interactive image
- SMILES: CN1C[C@H]2C[C@]2(C1)C#CC3=CC4=C(C=C3NC(=O)/C=C/CN5CCOCC5)C(=NC=N4)NC6=C(C(=CC=C6)Cl)F
- InChI: InChI=InChI=1S/C30H30ClFN6O2/c1-37-17-21-16-30(21,18-37)8-7-20-14-26-22(29(34-19-33-26)36-24-5-2-4-23(31)28(24)32)15-25(20)35-27(39)6-3-9-38-10-12-40-13-11-38/h2-6,14-15,19,21H,9-13,16-18H2,1H3,(H,35,39)(H,33,34,36)/b6-3+/t21-,30+/m1/s1; Key:LMOVDLRMIRLIJF-TUVXKDNKSA-N

Silevertinib is an investigational new drug that is being evaluated by Black Diamond Therapeutics for the treatment of glioblastoma and non-small cell lung cancer. It is a EGFR protein tyrosine kinase inhibitor.
