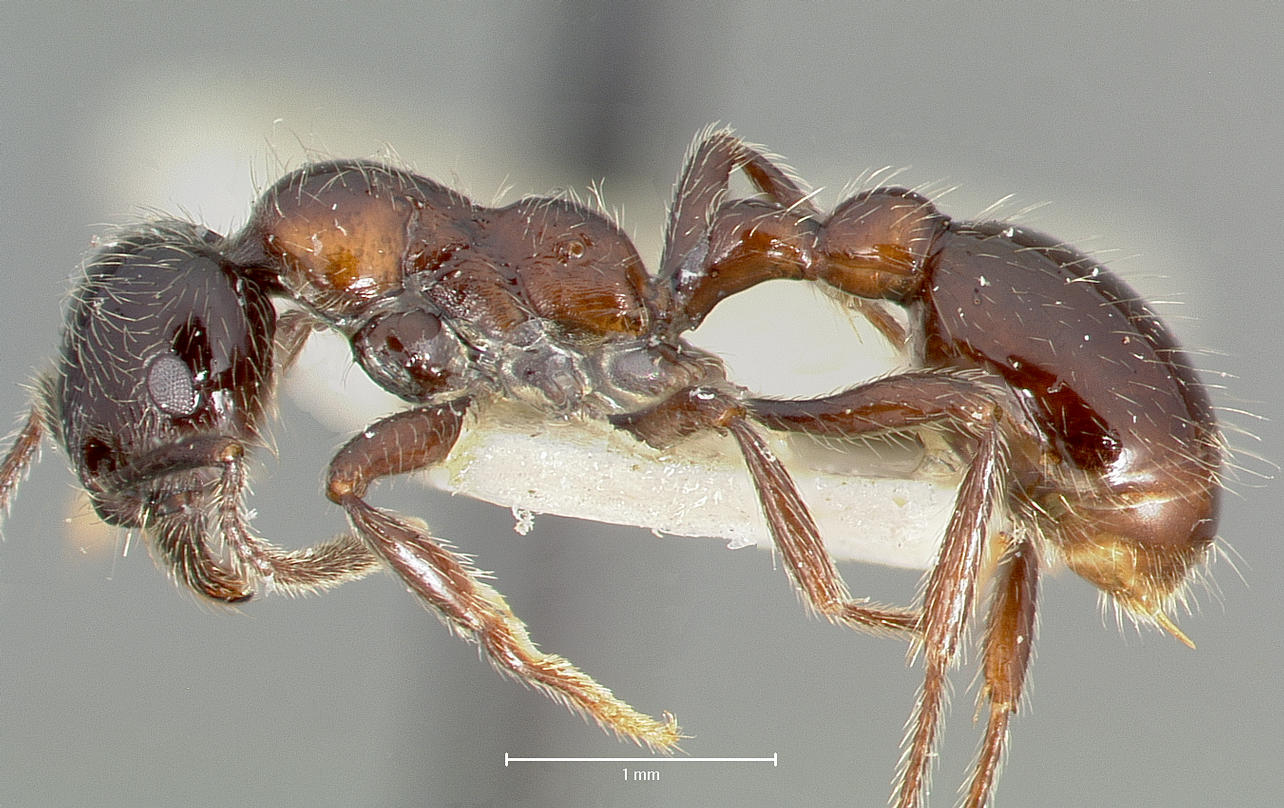
- Manica parasitica worker

Conservation status
- Vulnerable (IUCN 2.3)

Scientific classification
- Kingdom: Animalia
- Phylum: Arthropoda
- Class: Insecta
- Order: Hymenoptera
- Family: Formicidae
- Subfamily: Myrmicinae
- Genus: Manica
- Species: M. parasitica

Binomial name
- Manica parasitica Creighton, 1934

= Manica parasitica =

Species of ant

Manica parasitica is currently considered to be a species of ant in the subfamily Myrmicinae. It is endemic to California, United States.
