= Enozertinib =

Investigational drug

Clinical data
- Other names: ORIC 114; VRN 07

Identifiers
- IUPAC name: N-[2-[4-(4-cyclopropylpiperazin-1-yl)piperidin-1-yl]-5-[[6-[(3R)-3-(3,5-difluorophenyl)-1,2-oxazolidin-2-yl]pyrimidin-4-yl]amino]-4-methoxyphenyl]prop-2-enamide
- CAS Number: 2489185-38-6
- PubChem CID: 155696192
- IUPHAR/BPS: 13744
- UNII: DU24UP8R94

Chemical and physical data
- Formula: C35H42F2N8O3
- Molar mass: 660.771 g·mol^{−1}
- 3D model (JSmol): Interactive image
- SMILES: COC1=C(C=C(C(=C1)N2CCC(CC2)N3CCN(CC3)C4CC4)NC(=O)C=C)NC5=CC(=NC=N5)N6[C@H](CCO6)C7=CC(=CC(=C7)F)F
- InChI: InChI=InChI=1S/C35H42F2N8O3/c1-3-35(46)41-28-19-29(40-33-21-34(39-22-38-33)45-30(8-15-48-45)23-16-24(36)18-25(37)17-23)32(47-2)20-31(28)44-9-6-27(7-10-44)43-13-11-42(12-14-43)26-4-5-26/h3,16-22,26-27,30H,1,4-15H2,2H3,(H,41,46)(H,38,39,40)/t30-/m1/s1; Key:NNDXFTMFJKUUQA-SSEXGKCCSA-N

Enozertinib is an investigational new drug that is being developed by Voronoi for the treatment of solid tumors and non-small cell lung cancer. It is a EGFR receptor antagonist.
