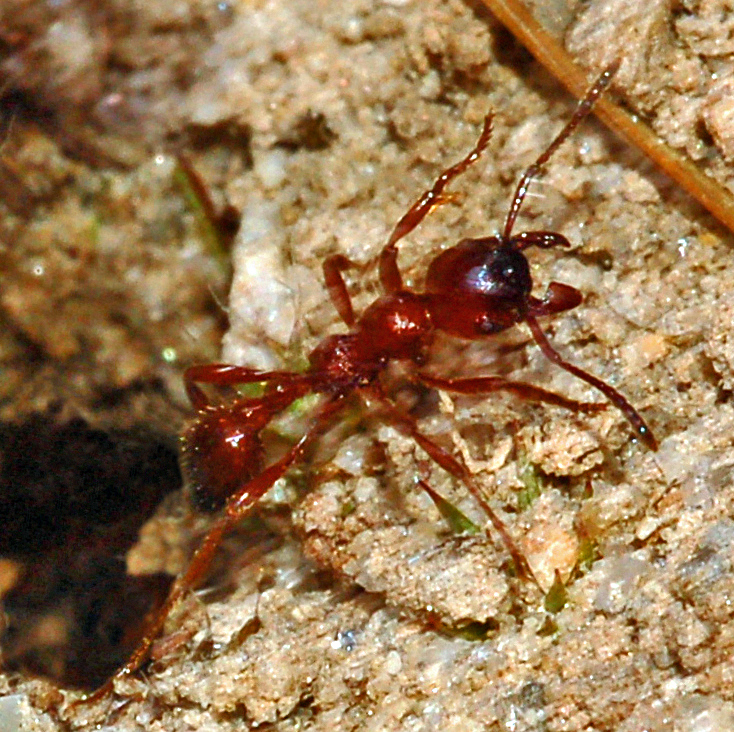
- Worker of Manica rubida at the nest entrance

Scientific classification
- Kingdom: Animalia
- Phylum: Arthropoda
- Class: Insecta
- Order: Hymenoptera
- Family: Formicidae
- Subfamily: Myrmicinae
- Genus: Manica
- Species: M. rubida

Binomial name
- Manica rubida (Latreille, 1802)

Synonyms
- Myrmica rubida (Latreille, 1802)

= Manica rubida =

Species of ant

Manica rubida is a species of ant in the subfamily Myrmicinae.

== Distribution ==
This species is present in Central and Southern Europe, in the Near East and in Georgia.

== Habitat ==
These ants prefer sunny mountain areas with poor vegetation, but can also be found in montane forests, at an elevation of 400–2,200 metres (1,300–7,200 ft) above sea level.

== Description ==
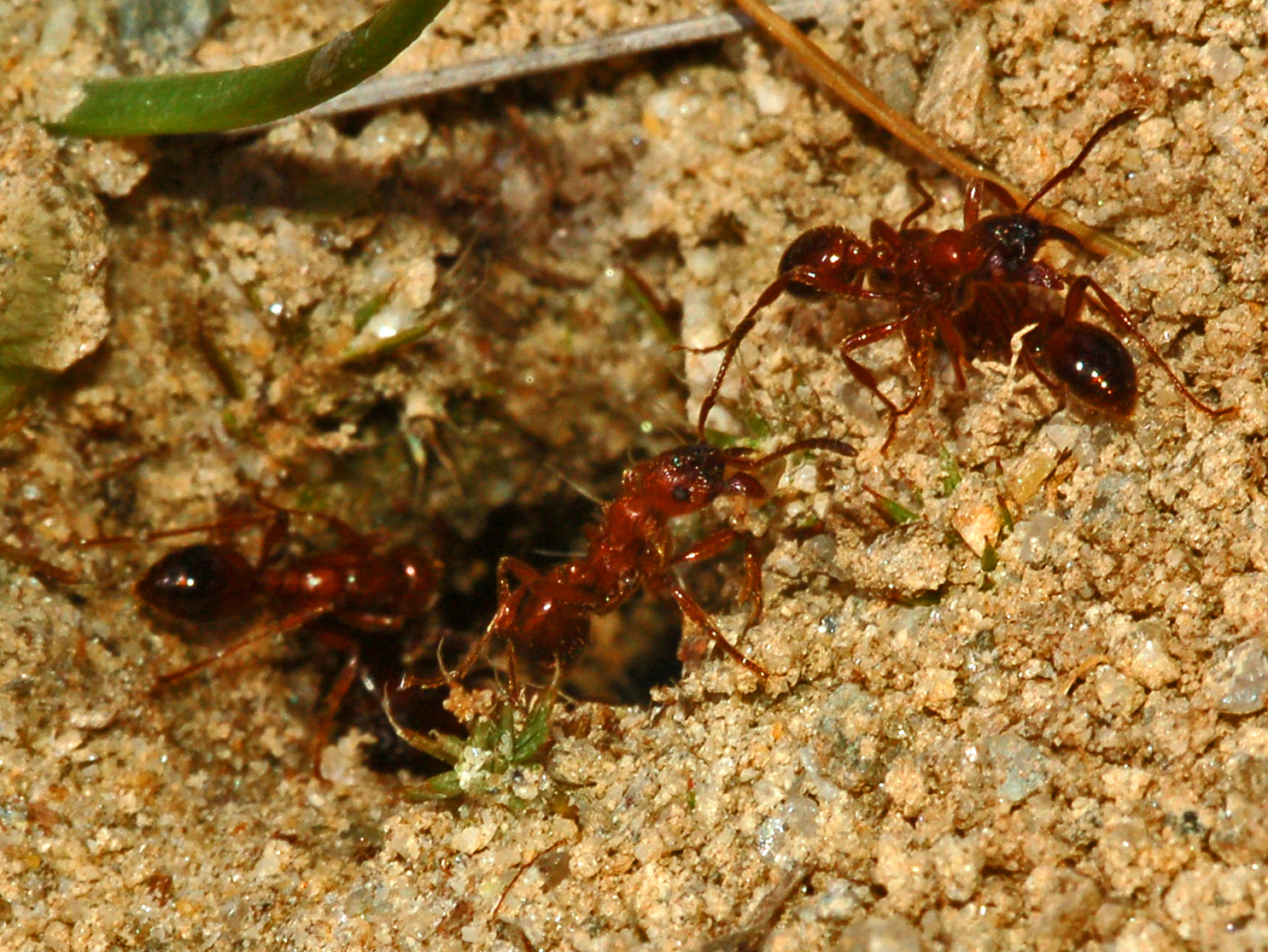
A nest of Manica rubida

Manica rubida can reach a length of 5–9 millimetres (0.20–0.35 in) in workers, of 9.5–13 millimetres (0.37–0.51 in) in queens, of 8–10 millimetres (0.31–0.39 in) in males. Workers are reddish brown, slender, usually with a darker head. Thorax and abdomen are very shiny and the abdomen is darker at the rear end. Queens are similar to workers, usually they have a slightly darker colour than the worker, but often they are totally dark. Males are black and glossy. Queens and workers have a venomous sting and their stings are very painful, but not dangerous.

== Biology ==
These ants feed on insects and honeydew. They are a little aggressive, but they defend only their immediate nesting area. Usually they build their nests under stones, but nests can also occur in the soil. These nests often can reach up to 3 meters depth. Around the large opening of their nests they may deposit sand and earth to form a wide flat crater. Colonies are often polygynous and can reach the size of several hundred workers. Swarming occurs from late May to the early September. Hibernation occurs from October to March.

== Bibliography ==
- Attygalle, A.B., Cammaerts, M.-C., Cammaerts, R., Morgan, E.D., and Ollett, D.G. 1986b. Chemical and ethological studies of the trail pheromone of the ant Manica rubida (Hymenoptera: Formicidae). Physiol. Entomol. 11:125-132.
- Bert Hölldobler, Edward O. Wilson: Ameisen. Die Entdeckung einer faszinierenden Welt. Aus dem Amerikanischen von Susanne Böll. Birkhäuser Verlag, Basel – Boston – Berlin 1995. ISBN 3-7643-5152-7
- Bestmann, H.J., Attygalle, A.B., Glasbrenner, J., Riemer, R., Vostrowsky, O., Constantino, M.G., Melikian, G., and Morgan, E.D. 1988c. Pheromones 65. Identification of the volatile components of the mandibular gland secretion of the ant Manica rubida: structure elucidation, synthesis, and absolute configuration of manicone. Liebig's Ann. Chem. 1:55-60.
- Jackson, B.D., Cammaerts, M.-C., Morgan, E.D., and Attygalle, A.B. 1990b. Chemical and behavioral studies on Dufour gland contents of Manica rubida (Hymenoptera: Formicidae). J. Chem. Ecol. 16:827-840.
- Radchenko A, Czechowska W, Czechowski W: Klucze do oznaczania owadów Polski. Część XXIV Błonkówki – Hymenoptera Zeszyt 63 Mrówki – Formicidae. Toruń: 2004, s. 54.
