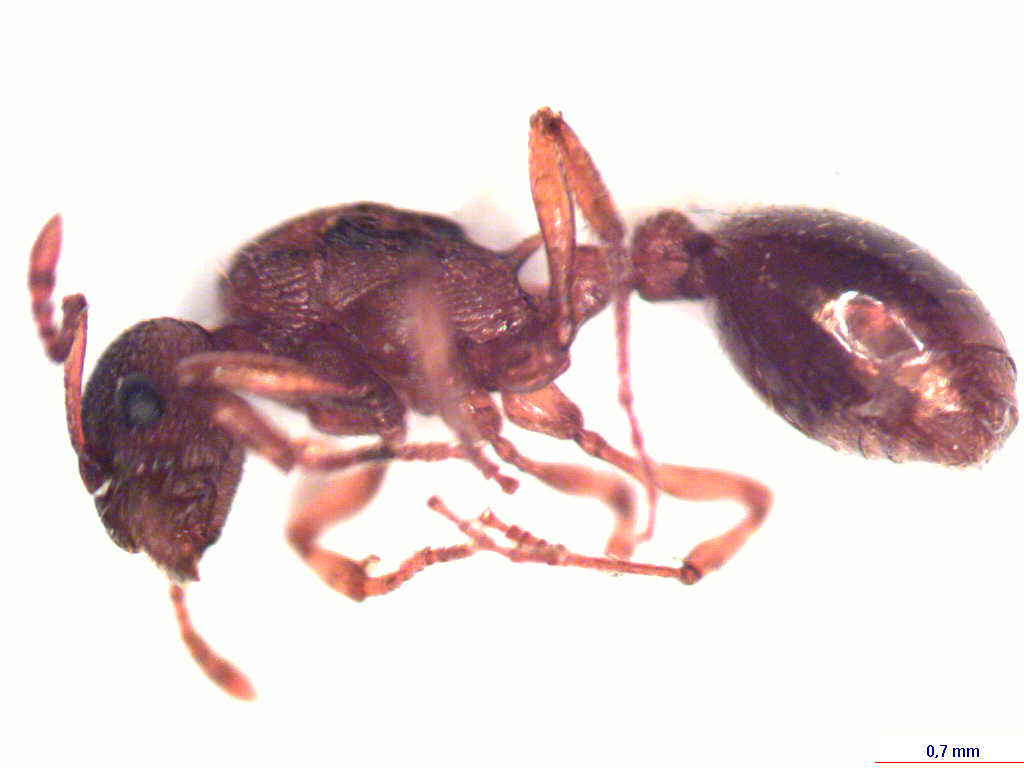
- Myrmica rubra

Scientific classification
- Kingdom: Animalia
- Phylum: Arthropoda
- Class: Insecta
- Order: Hymenoptera
- Family: Formicidae
- Subfamily: Myrmicinae
- Tribe: Myrmicini; Lepeletier de Saint-Fargeau, 1835

Type genus
- Myrmica

Diversity
- 4 genera

= Myrmicini =

Tribe of ants

Myrmicini is a tribe of ants in the subfamily Myrmicinae. It is one of the most basal tribes of its subfamily, and is thought of being the sister tribe to Pogonomyrmecini as of 2025.

== Genera ==
- Manica Jurine, 1807
- Myrmica Latreille, 1804
- †Plesiomyrmex Dlussky & Radchenko, 2009
- †Protomyrmica Dlussky & Radchenko, 2009
