= Vebreltinib =

Chemical compound

Clinical data
- Other names: Bozitinib; APL-101; PBL-1001
- Routes of administration: Oral
- ATC code: None

Legal status
- Legal status: Rx in China

Identifiers
- IUPAC name: 6-(1-Cyclopropylpyrazol-4-yl)-3-[difluoro-(6-fluoro-2-methylindazol-5-yl)methyl]-[1,2,4]triazolo[4,3-b]pyridazine
- CAS Number: 1440964-89-5
- PubChem CID: 72202701
- DrugBank: DB16823
- ChemSpider: 72388443
- UNII: 2WZP8A9VFN
- ChEMBL: ChEMBL4650443

Chemical and physical data
- Formula: C_{20}H_{15}F_{3}N_{8}
- Molar mass: 424.391 g·mol^{−1}
- 3D model (JSmol): Interactive image
- SMILES: CN1C=C2C=C(C(=CC2=N1)F)C(C3=NN=C4N3N=C(C=C4)C5=CN(N=C5)C6CC6)(F)F
- InChI: InChI=1S/C20H15F3N8/c1-29-9-11-6-14(15(21)7-17(11)27-29)20(22,23)19-26-25-18-5-4-16(28-31(18)19)12-8-24-30(10-12)13-2-3-13/h4-10,13H,2-3H2,1H3; Key:QHXLXUIZUCJRKV-UHFFFAOYSA-N

Vebreltinib (also known as bozitinib) is a pharmaceutical drug used for the treatment of cancer.

Vebreltinib selectively binds to c-Met, preventing its phosphorylation and thereby disrupting c-Met signal transduction pathways.

In China, it is approved for the treatment of non-small-cell lung cancer (NSCLC) with MET exon 14 skipping mutations.
