= Spitz (protein) =

Protein in Drosophila melanogaster

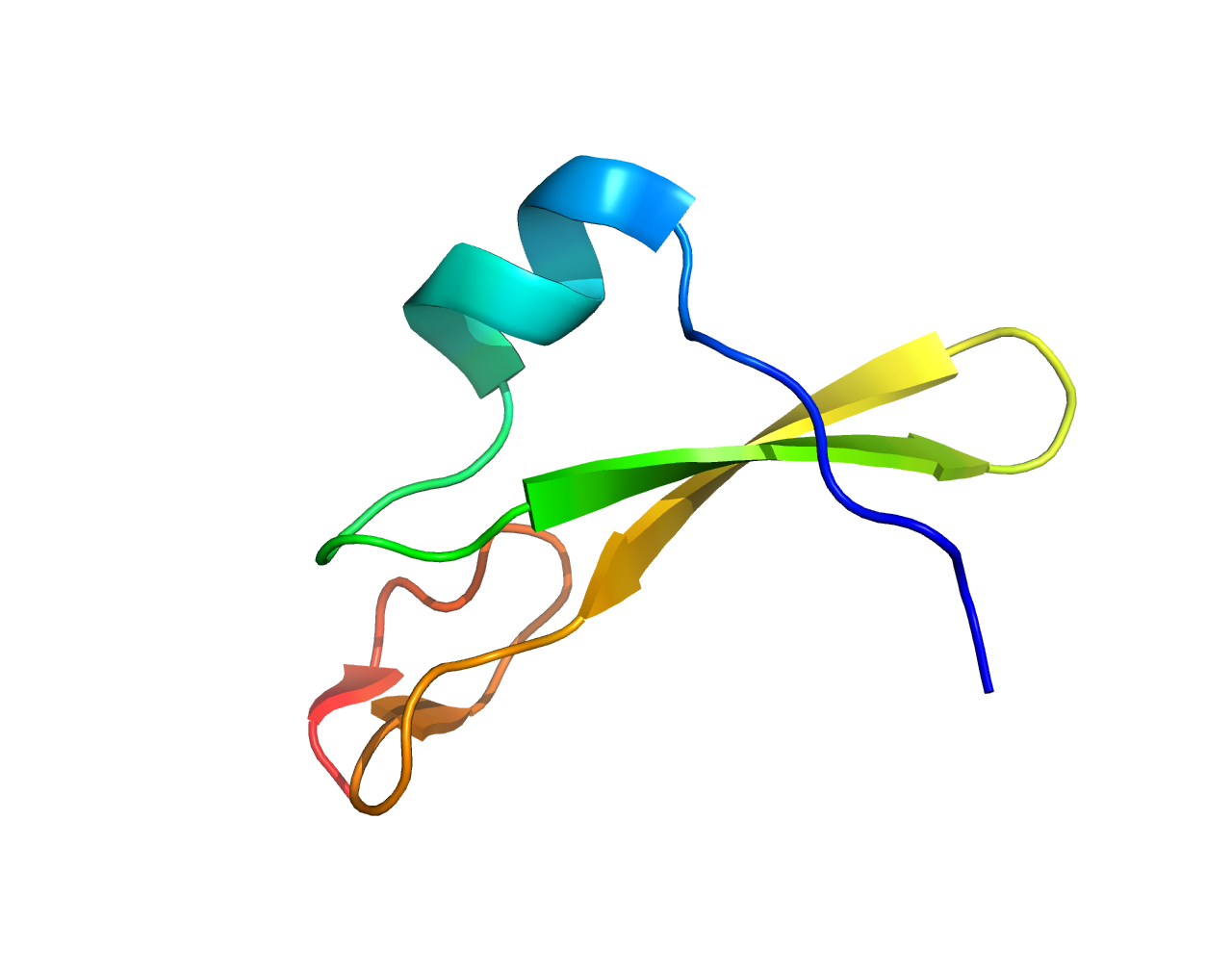
- Spitz protein

Identifiers
- Organism: Drosophila melanogaster
- Symbol: SPI
- Entrez: 35253
- PDB: 3LTF
- RefSeq (Prot): NM_057561
- UniProt: Q01083
Search for
- Structures: Swiss-model
- Domains: InterPro

Spitz is a protein in Drosophila species which is the major activator of their epidermal growth factor receptor (EGFR).

== Function ==
Spitz is produced as a transmembrane protein in the endoplasmic reticulum. There it associates with a cargo receptor called Star and is trafficked to the Golgi. In the Golgi, Spitz is cleaved by a protease called Rhomboid, which releases Spitz to be trafficked to the cell membrane and released out of the cell. From here it can bind EGFR on the surface of other cells, activating the receptor. Alternatively, Spitz can be bound and inactivated by Argos, inhibiting EGFR activation.

Spitz is responsible for activating signaling of the Drosophila epidermal growth factor receptor (DER) and is involved in the development of the embryos, eyes, and wings of fruit flies. Spitz can be sequestered and prevented from binding to DER by the protein Argos (Aos) which then inhibits the epidermal growth factor receptor pathway. Over-expression of epidermal growth factor receptors contribute to human cancers, so the sequestering of activating ligands may be useful in developing ways to diminish EGFR ligands for cancer treatment.

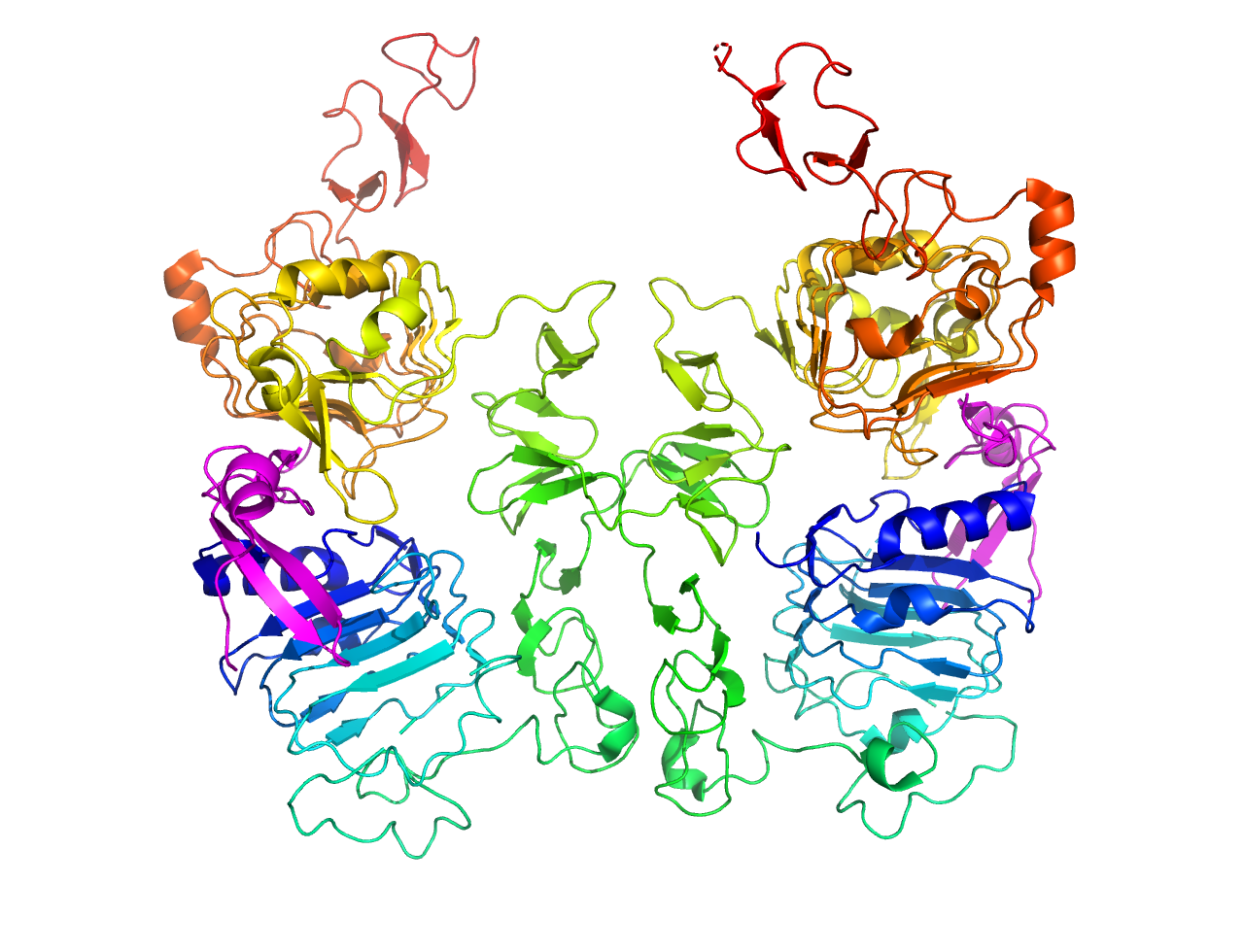
Structure of the complex that forms between the protein Spitz and the epidermal growth factor receptor. The magenta sections are the two spitz proteins

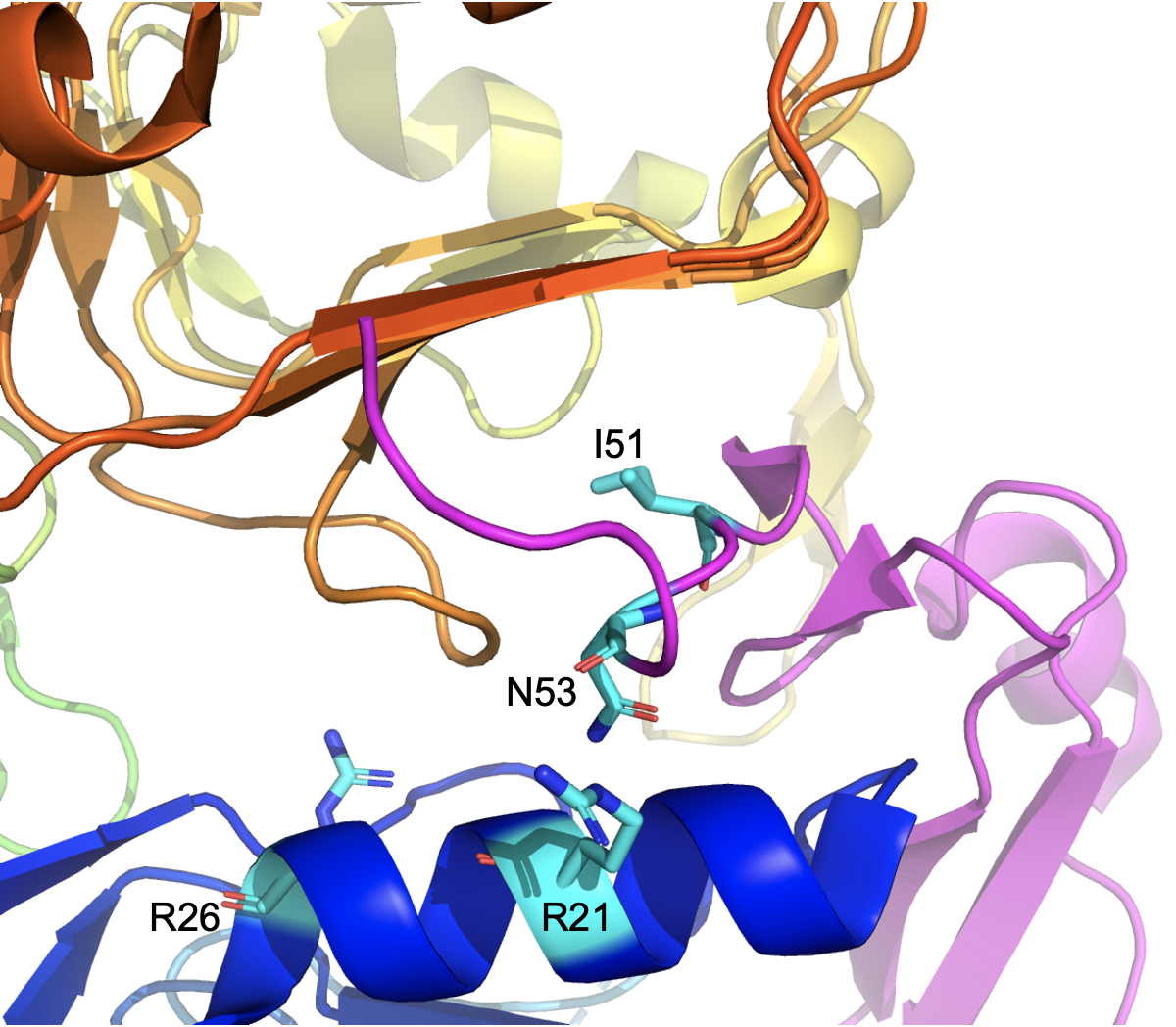
The interaction of residues R21 and R26 (from the right side of EGFR) with N53 and I51 (from Spitz) in the binding of the Spitz protein to EGFR

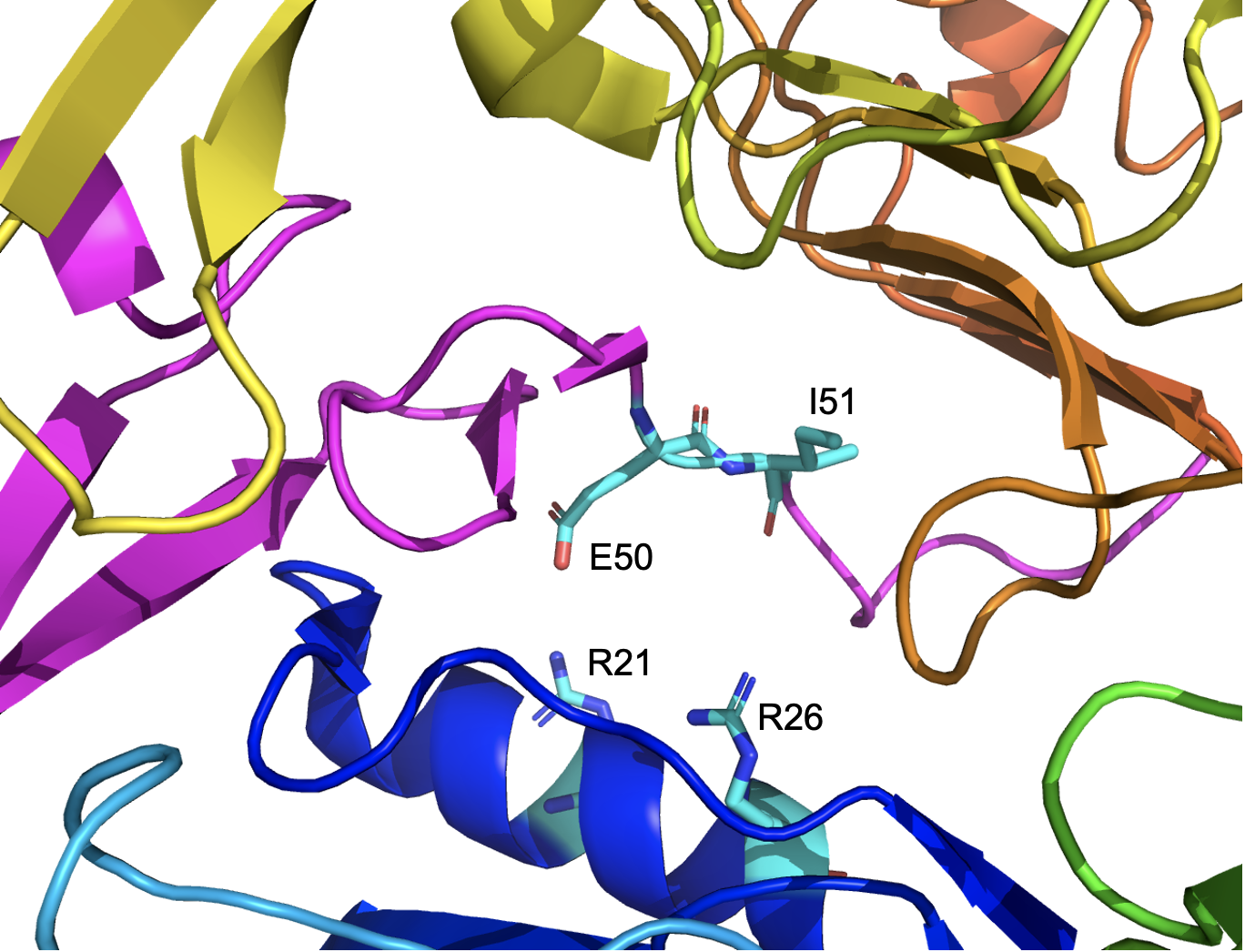
The interaction of residues R21 and R26 (from the left side of EGFR) with E50 and I51 (from Spitz) in the binding of the Spitz protein to the epidermal growth factor receptor

== Structure ==
The protein Spitz is structurally similar to transforming growth factor-α (TGF-α) and is a homologue of TGF-α, along with other proteins found in Drosophila such as Gurken and Keren. These proteins are processed by Star, a transmembrane protein, and Rhomboid (Rho), a protease. Spitz binds to and regulates the epidermal growth factor receptor.

== Epidermal growth factor receptor (EGFR) binding ==
EGFR exists as a dimer, and two Spitz proteins bind to the receptor to regulate its function. The dimer is referred to as two subunits: the left hand subunit and the right hand subunit. The binding of the two Spitz proteins on either subunit are not identical, as different amino acid residues participate in the binding on either side. On the right hand side, Arg21 and Arg26 of EGFR interact with residues Asn50 and Ile51 of Spitz. On the left hand side, Arg21 and Arg26 of the other part of the dimer interact with Glu53 and Ile51 of another Spitz protein. The Spitz protein can wedge apart the I and III domains of one of the EGFR subunits, subsequently relocating domain I away from domain III and causing new interactions between side chains of the EGFR subunit. Research has shown that there is negative cooperativity in the binding of the Spitz ligands to EGFR, where the binding event of the second ligand to the dimer decreases the affinity of the receptors for one another. The specificity, autophosphorylation, mechanism, and other behaviors of the dimer can change significantly when it is weakened by the double-occupancy of the Spitz proteins.
