= Epidermal growth factor receptor =

Transmembrane protein

EGFR
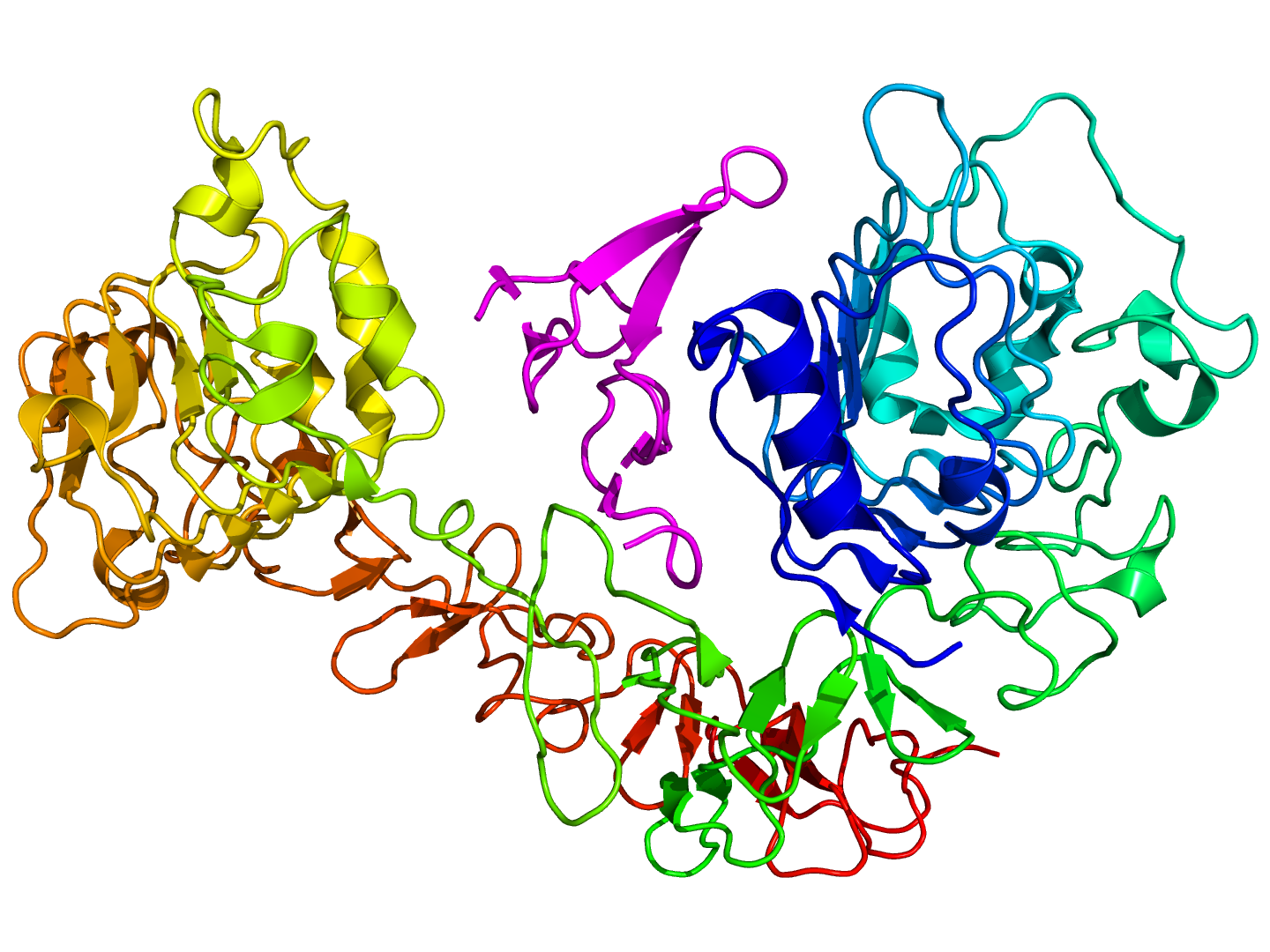

Identifiers
- Aliases: EGFR, ERBB, ERBB1, HER1, NISBD2, PIG61, mENA, epidermal growth factor receptor, Genes, erbB-1, ERRP
- External IDs: OMIM: 131550; MGI: 95294; GeneCards: EGFR
Available structures
PDB	Ortholog search: PDBe RCSB
PDB	List of PDB id codes 1IVO, 1M14, 1M17, 1MOX, 1NQL, 1XKK, 1YY9, 1Z9I, 2EB2, 2EB3, 2GS2, 2GS6, 2GS7, 2ITN, 2ITO, 2ITP, 2ITQ, 2ITT, 2ITU, 2ITV, 2ITW, 2ITY, 2ITZ, 2J5E, 2J5F, 2J6M, 2JIT, 2JIU, 2JIV, 2KS1, 2M0B, 2M20, 2RF9, 2RFD, 2RFE, 2RGP, 3B2U, 3B2V, 3BEL, 3BUO, 3C09, 3G5V, 3G5Y, 3GOP, 3GT8, 3IKA, 3LZB, 3NJP, 3OB2, 3OP0, 3P0Y, 3PFV, 3POZ, 3QWQ, 3UG1, 3UG2, 3VJN, 3VJO, 3VRP, 3VRR, 3W2O, 3W2P, 3W2Q, 3W2R, 3W2S, 3W32, 3W33, 4G5J, 4G5P, 4HJO, 4I1Z, 4I20, 4I21, 4I22, 4I23, 4I24, 4JQ7, 4JQ8, 4JR3, 4JRV, 4KRL, 4KRM, 4KRO, 4KRP, 4LI5, 4LL0, 4LQM, 4LRM, 4R3P, 4R3R, 4R5S, 4RIW, 4RIX, 4RIY, 4RJ4, 4RJ5, 4RJ6, 4RJ7, 4RJ8, 4TKS, 4WKQ, 4WRG, 4ZJV, 5CNN, 5CNO, 5CAN, 2N5S, 5CAL, 5C8M, 4UV7, 5CAV, 5CZI, 5EDQ, 5CAS, 5CAO, 5CAP, 5EM5, 5HG5, 5EDR, 5EM8, 5EDP, 5HG7, 5CAU, 5C8K, 5C8N, 5CZH, 5CAQ, 5EM6, 4UIP, 5HG9, 5EM7, 5HG8, 4ZSE, 5HIB, 5HIC, 5D41, 4WD5
Enzyme activity
EC #	BRENDA	ExPASy	KEGG	MetaCyc
2.7.10.1	↗	↗	↗	↗

Gene location (Human)
Chr.	Chromosome 7 (human)
Band	7p11.2	Start	55,019,017 bp
Band	7p11.2	End	55,211,628 bp

Gene location (Mouse)
Chr.	Chromosome 11 (mouse)
Band	11 A2|11 9.41 cM	Start	16,702,203 bp
Band	11 A2|11 9.41 cM	End	16,868,158 bp
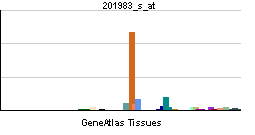
RNA expression pattern
Bgee	Human / Mouse (ortholog); Top expressed in: nipple; gums; gingival epithelium; placenta; vulva; skin of hip; superficial temporal artery; decidua; human penis; mucosa of pharynx / Top expressed in: left lobe of liver; rib; Dermatocranium; external carotid artery; skin of abdomen; conjunctival fornix; hair follicle; zygote; phalanx of foot; calvaria; More reference expression data
BioGPS	More reference expression data
Gene ontology
Molecular function	kinase activity; nitric-oxide synthase regulator activity; transmembrane receptor protein tyrosine kinase activity; protein phosphatase binding; ATP binding; protein kinase activity; enzyme binding; MAP kinase kinase kinase activity; transferase activity; chromatin binding; actin filament binding; double-stranded DNA binding; transmembrane signaling receptor activity; nucleotide binding; signal transducer activity; identical protein binding; signaling receptor binding; protein tyrosine kinase activity; calmodulin binding; protein kinase binding; phosphatidylinositol-4,5-bisphosphate 3-kinase activity; protein heterodimerization activity; integrin binding; epidermal growth factor binding; epidermal growth factor-activated receptor activity; ubiquitin protein ligase binding; cadherin binding; virus receptor activity; protein binding
Cellular component	cytoplasm; endosome; multivesicular body, internal vesicle lumen; nuclear membrane; membrane; focal adhesion; extracellular region; perinuclear region of cytoplasm; nucleus; cell surface; endoplasmic reticulum; integral component of membrane; Golgi apparatus; early endosome membrane; receptor complex; plasma membrane; endocytic vesicle; intracellular anatomical structure; AP-2 adaptor complex; endosome membrane; endoplasmic reticulum membrane; Golgi membrane; basolateral plasma membrane; Shc-EGFR complex; membrane raft; apical plasma membrane; synapse; extracellular space; clathrin-coated vesicle membrane; integral component of plasma membrane; basal plasma membrane; protein-containing complex
Biological process	positive regulation of protein phosphorylation; negative regulation of epidermal growth factor receptor signaling pathway; positive regulation of MAP kinase activity; protein phosphorylation; cell surface receptor signaling pathway; protein insertion into membrane; cell population proliferation; morphogenesis of an epithelial fold; ossification; negative regulation of protein catabolic process; transmembrane receptor protein tyrosine kinase signaling pathway; positive regulation of fibroblast proliferation; activation of phospholipase C activity; epidermis development; learning or memory; protein autophosphorylation; positive regulation of phosphorylation; cerebral cortex cell migration; digestive tract morphogenesis; hair follicle development; phosphorylation; positive regulation of epithelial cell proliferation; embryonic placenta development; eyelid development in camera-type eye; activation of phospholipase A2 activity; positive regulation of DNA replication; response to UV-A; regulation of peptidyl-tyrosine phosphorylation; positive regulation of cell migration; positive regulation of nitric oxide biosynthetic process; cellular response to estradiol stimulus; positive regulation of DNA repair; response to stress; regulation of nitric-oxide synthase activity; salivary gland morphogenesis; MAPK cascade; cellular response to epidermal growth factor stimulus; multicellular organism development; regulation of cell population proliferation; cell morphogenesis; cellular response to amino acid stimulus; signal transduction; positive regulation of transcription by RNA polymerase II; lung development; positive regulation of synaptic transmission, glutamatergic; positive regulation of ERK1 and ERK2 cascade; phosphatidylinositol phosphate biosynthetic process; circadian rhythm; positive regulation of superoxide anion generation; positive regulation of cell population proliferation; positive regulation of vasoconstriction; response to osmotic stress; tongue development; negative regulation of apoptotic process; response to cobalamin; liver regeneration; response to calcium ion; wound healing; cellular response to dexamethasone stimulus; negative regulation of mitotic cell cycle; cellular response to growth factor stimulus; hydrogen peroxide metabolic process; response to oxidative stress; response to lipid; regulation of cell motility; intracellular signal transduction; response to organic cyclic compound; magnesium ion homeostasis; protein biosynthesis; positive regulation of production of miRNAs involved in gene silencing by miRNA; positive regulation of smooth muscle cell proliferation; positive regulation of bone resorption; midgut development; positive regulation of inflammatory response; liver development; diterpenoid metabolic process; ERBB2 signaling pathway; response to estradiol; positive regulation of cell growth; positive regulation of prolactin secretion; astrocyte activation; cellular response to mechanical stimulus; response to hydroxyisoflavone; neuron projection morphogenesis; ovarian cycle; regulation of transcription by RNA polymerase II; peptidyl-tyrosine phosphorylation; membrane organization; positive regulation of protein kinase C activity; negative regulation of ERBB signaling pathway; positive regulation of protein localization to plasma membrane; negative regulation of cardiocyte differentiation; cellular response to reactive oxygen species; positive regulation of transcription, DNA-templated; regulation of JNK cascade; regulation of ERK1 and ERK2 cascade; cellular response to cadmium ion; positive regulation of NIK/NF-kappaB signaling; viral entry into host cell; epidermal growth factor receptor signaling pathway; positive regulation of peptidyl-serine phosphorylation; peptidyl-tyrosine autophosphorylation; cell-cell adhesion; regulation of phosphatidylinositol 3-kinase signaling; positive regulation of protein kinase B signaling; positive regulation of nitric oxide mediated signal transduction; cell differentiation; positive regulation of cyclin-dependent protein serine/threonine kinase activity; negative regulation of Notch signaling pathway; positive regulation of canonical Wnt signaling pathway; positive regulation of G1/S transition of mitotic cell cycle
Sources:Amigo / QuickGO
Orthologs
Databases	NCBI: entry; OMA: entry
Species	Human	Mouse
Entrez	1956	13649
Ensembl	ENSG00000146648	ENSMUSG00000020122
UniProt	P00533	Q01279
RefSeq (mRNA)	NM_001346897; NM_001346898; NM_001346899; NM_001346900; NM_001346941 NM_005228; NM_201282; NM_201283; NM_201284	NM_007912; NM_207655
RefSeq (protein)	NP_001333826; NP_001333827; NP_001333828; NP_001333829; NP_001333870 NP_005219; NP_958439; NP_958440; NP_958441	NP_031938; NP_997538
Location (UCSC)	Chr 7: 55.02 – 55.21 Mb	Chr 11: 16.7 – 16.87 Mb
PubMed search
- Wikidata
View/Edit Human	View/Edit Mouse

The epidermal growth factor receptor (EGFR; ErbB-1; HER1 in humans) is a transmembrane protein that is a receptor for members of the epidermal growth factor family (EGF family) of extracellular protein ligands.

The epidermal growth factor receptor is a member of the ErbB family of receptors, a subfamily of four closely related receptor tyrosine kinases: EGFR (ErbB-1), HER2/neu (ErbB-2), Her 3 (ErbB-3) and Her 4 (ErbB-4). In many cancer types, mutations affecting EGFR expression or activity could result in cancer.

Epidermal growth factor and its receptor were discovered by Stanley Cohen of Vanderbilt University. Cohen shared the 1986 Nobel Prize in Medicine with Rita Levi-Montalcini for their discovery of growth factors.

Deficient signaling of the EGFR and other receptor tyrosine kinases in humans is associated with diseases such as Alzheimer's, while over-expression is associated with the development of a wide variety of tumors. Interruption of EGFR signalling, either by blocking EGFR binding sites on the extracellular domain of the receptor or by inhibiting intracellular tyrosine kinase activity, can prevent the growth of EGFR-expressing tumours and improve the patient's condition.

== Function ==
EGFR signaling cascades

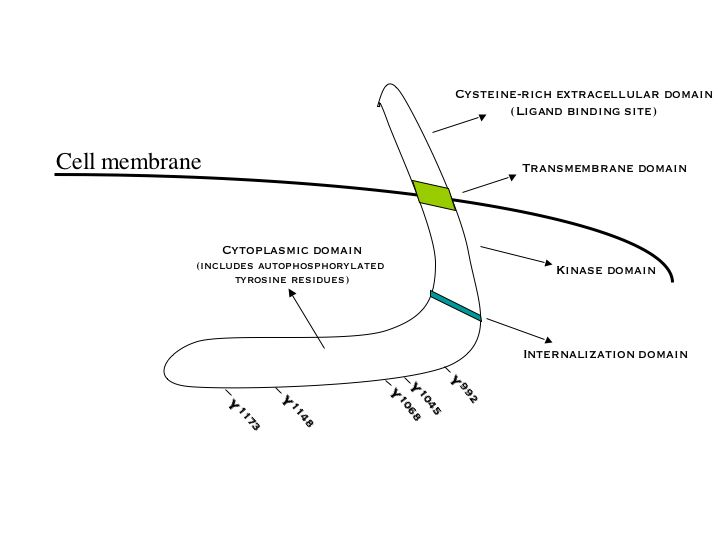
Diagram of the EGF receptor highlighting important domains

Epidermal growth factor receptor (EGFR) is a transmembrane protein that is activated by binding of its specific ligands, including epidermal growth factor and transforming growth factor alpha (TGF-α). ErbB2 has no known direct activating ligand, and may be in an activated state constitutively or become active upon heterodimerization with other family members such as EGFR. Upon activation by its growth factor ligands, EGFR undergoes a transition from an inactive monomeric form to an active homodimer. – although there is some evidence that preformed inactive dimers may also exist before ligand binding. In addition to forming homodimers after ligand binding, EGFR may pair with another member of the ErbB receptor family, such as ErbB2/Her2/neu, to create an activated heterodimer. There is also evidence to suggest that clusters of activated EGFRs form, although it remains unclear whether this clustering is important for activation itself or occurs after activation of individual dimers.

EGFR dimerization stimulates its intrinsic intracellular protein-tyrosine kinase activity. As a result, autophosphorylation of several tyrosine (Y) residues in the C-terminal domain of EGFR occurs. These include Y992, Y1045, Y1068, Y1148, and Y1173, as shown in the adjacent diagram. This autophosphorylation elicits downstream activation and signaling by several other proteins that associate with the phosphorylated tyrosines through their own phosphotyrosine-binding SH2 domains. These downstream signaling proteins initiate several signal transduction cascades, principally the MAPK, Akt and JNK pathways, leading to DNA synthesis and cell proliferation. Such proteins modulate phenotypes such as cell migration, adhesion, and proliferation. Activation of the receptor is important for the innate immune response in human skin. Additionally, the kinase domain of the EGFR can cross-phosphorylate the tyrosine residues of other receptors with which it is aggregated and thereby activate itself.

== Biological roles ==
The EGFR is essential for ductal development of the mammary glands, and agonists of the EGFR such as amphiregulin, TGF-α, and heregulin induce both ductal and lobuloalveolar development even in the absence of estrogen and progesterone.

== Role in human disease ==
=== Cancer ===
A protein found on the cell surface of some cells that binds to the epidermal growth factor protein. Epidermal growth factor receptor is involved in cellular pathways that control cell division and survival.

Mutations that lead to EGFR overexpression (known as upregulation or amplification) have been associated with a number of cancers, including adenocarcinoma of the lung (40% of cases), anal cancers, glioblastoma (50%) and epithelian tumors of the head and neck (80–100%). These somatic mutations involving EGFR lead to its constant activation, which produces uncontrolled cell division. In glioblastoma a specific mutation of EGFR, called EGFRvIII, is often observed. Mutations, amplifications or misregulations of EGFR or family members are implicated in about 30% of all epithelial cancers. Germline genetic variation in EGFR has been implicated in elevation of lung cancer risk.

=== Inflammatory disease ===
Aberrant EGFR signaling has been implicated in psoriasis, eczema and atherosclerosis. However, its exact roles in these conditions are ill-defined.

=== Monogenic disease ===
A single child displaying multi-organ epithelial inflammation was found to have a homozygous loss-of-function mutation in the EGFR gene. The pathogenicity of the EGFR mutation was supported by in vitro experiments and functional analysis of a skin biopsy. His severe phenotype reflects many previous research findings into EGFR function. His clinical features included a papulopustular rash, dry skin, chronic diarrhoea, abnormalities of hair growth, breathing difficulties, and electrolyte imbalances.

=== Wound healing and fibrosis ===
EGFR has been shown to play a critical role in TGF-beta1 dependent fibroblast to myofibroblast differentiation. Aberrant persistence of myofibroblasts within tissues can lead to progressive tissue fibrosis, impairing tissue or organ function (e.g. skin hypertrophic or keloid scars, liver cirrhosis, myocardial fibrosis, chronic kidney disease).

== Medical applications ==
=== Drug target ===
The identification of EGFR as an oncogene has led to the development of anticancer therapeutics directed against EGFR (called "EGFR inhibitors", EGFRi), including gefitinib, erlotinib, afatinib, brigatinib and icotinib for lung cancer, and cetuximab for colon cancer. More recently AstraZeneca has developed Osimertinib, a third generation tyrosine kinase inhibitor.

Many therapeutic approaches are aimed at the EGFR. Cetuximab and panitumumab are examples of monoclonal antibody inhibitors. However, the former is of the IgG1 type, the latter of the IgG2 type; consequences on antibody-dependent cellular cytotoxicity can be quite different. Other monoclonals in clinical development are zalutumumab, nimotuzumab, and matuzumab. The monoclonal antibodies block the extracellular ligand-binding domain. With the binding site blocked, signal molecules can no longer attach there and activate the tyrosine kinase.

Another method is using small molecules to inhibit the EGFR tyrosine kinase, which is on the cytoplasmic side of the receptor. Without kinase activity, EGFR is unable to activate itself, which is a prerequisite for the binding of downstream adaptor proteins. Ostensibly, by halting the signaling cascade in cells that rely on this pathway for growth, tumor proliferation and migration are diminished. Gefitinib, erlotinib, brigatinib and lapatinib (mixed EGFR and ERBB2 inhibitor) are examples of small molecule kinase inhibitors.

CimaVax-EGF, an active vaccine targeting EGF as the major ligand of EGF, uses a different approach, raising antibodies against EGF itself, thereby denying EGFR-dependent cancers of a proliferative stimulus; it is in use as a cancer therapy against non-small-cell lung carcinoma (the most common form of lung cancer) in Cuba, and is undergoing further trials for possible licensing in Japan, Europe, and the United States.

There are several quantitative methods available that use protein phosphorylation detection to identify EGFR family inhibitors.

New drugs such as osimertinib, gefitinib, erlotinib and brigatinib directly target the EGFR. Patients have been divided into EGFR-positive and EGFR-negative, based upon whether a tissue test shows a mutation. EGFR-positive patients have shown a 60% response rate, which exceeds the response rate for conventional chemotherapy.

However, many patients develop resistance. Two primary sources of resistance are the T790M mutation and MET oncogene. However, as of 2010, there was no consensus of an accepted approach to combat resistance nor FDA approval of a specific combination. Clinical trial phase II results reported for brigatinib targeting the T790M mutation, and brigatinib received Breakthrough Therapy designation status by the FDA in February 2015.

The most common adverse effect of EGFR inhibitors, found in more than 90% of patients, is a papulopustular rash that spreads across the face and torso; the rash's presence is correlated with the drug's antitumor effect. In 10% to 15% of patients, the effects can be serious and require treatment.

Some tests are aiming at predicting benefit from EGFR treatment, as Veristrat.

Laboratory research using genetically engineered stem cells to target EGFR in mice was reported in 2014 to show promise. EGFR is a well-established target for monoclonal antibodies and specific tyrosine kinase inhibitors.

Andamertinib (GTPL13732), enozertinib (VRN 07), firmonertinib (AST-2818;), and silevertinib (RVU-120) are more recent examples of small molecule EGFR inhibitors.

=== Target for imaging agents ===
Imaging agents have been developed which identify EGFR-dependent cancers using labeled EGF. The feasibility of in vivo imaging of EGFR expression has been demonstrated in several studies.

It has been proposed that certain computed tomography findings, such as ground-glass opacities, air bronchogram, spiculated margins, vascular convergence, and pleural retraction, can predict the presence of EGFR mutation in patients with non-small cell lung cancer.

== Interactions ==
Epidermal growth factor receptor has been shown to interact with:

- AR,
- ARF4,
- CAV1,
- CAV3,
- CBL,
- CBLB,
- CBLC,
- CD44,
- CDC25A,
- CRK,
- CTNNB1,
- DCN,
- EGF,
- GRB14,
- Grb2,
- JAK2,
- MUC1,
- NCK1,
- NCK2
- PKC alpha,
- PLCG1,
- PLSCR1,
- PTPN1,
- PTPN11,
- PTPN6,
- PTPRK,
- SH2D3A,
- SH3KBP1,
- SHC1,
- SOS1,
- Src,
- STAT1,
- STAT3,
- STAT5A,
- UBC, and
- WAS,
- PAR2.

In fruitflies, the epidermal growth factor receptor interacts with Spitz.
