= Epidermal growth factor =

Protein that stimulates cell division and differentiation

EGF
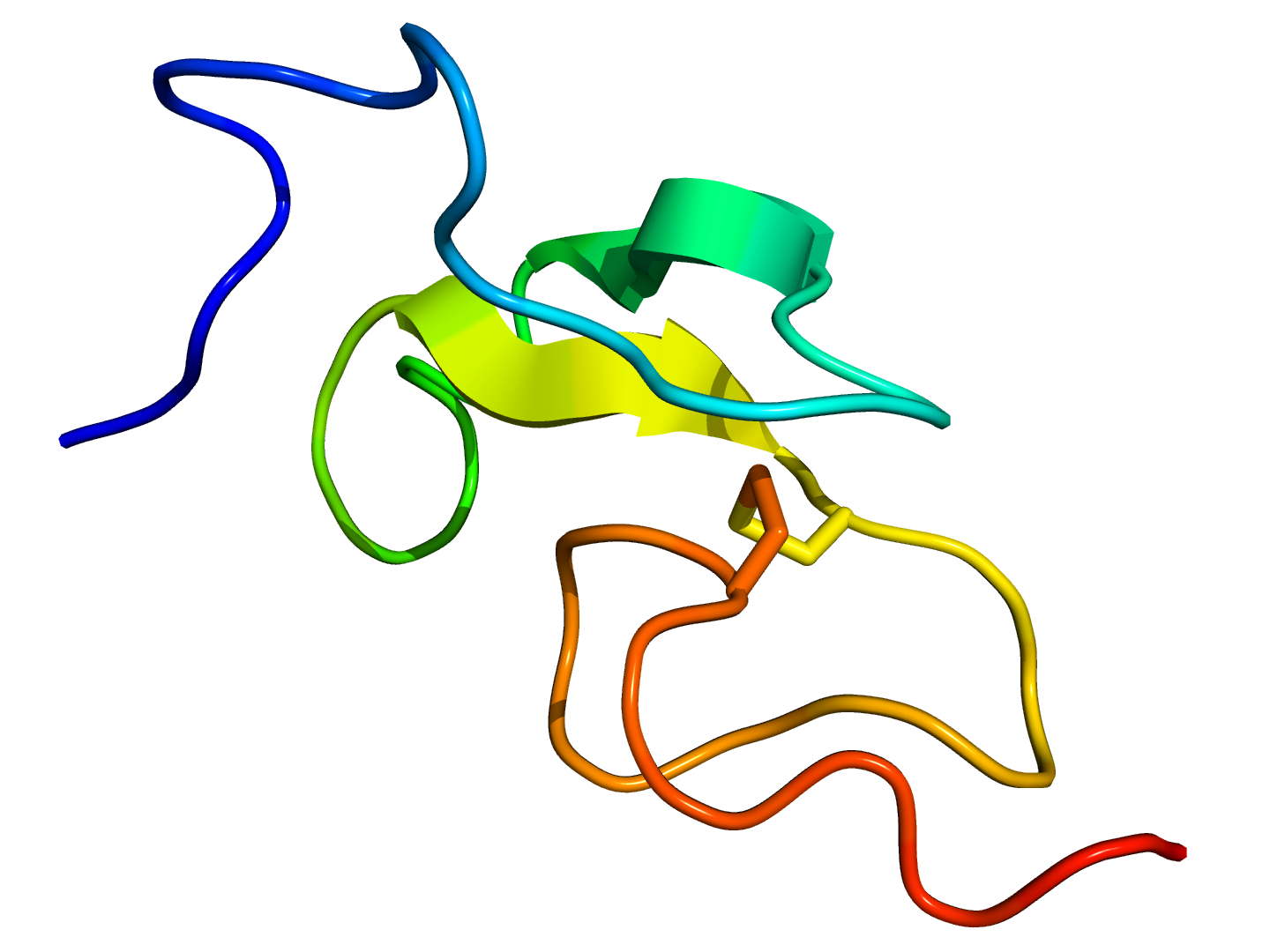

Identifiers
- Aliases: EGF, HOMG4, URG, epidermal growth factor, epithelial growth factor
- External IDs: OMIM: 131530; MGI: 95290; GeneCards: EGF
Available structures
PDB	Ortholog search: PDBe RCSB
PDB	List of PDB id codes 1IVO, 1JL9, 1NQL, 1P9J, 2KV4, 3NJP

Gene location (Human)
Chr.	Chromosome 4 (human)
Band	4q25	Start	109,912,883 bp
Band	4q25	End	110,013,766 bp

Gene location (Mouse)
Chr.	Chromosome 3 (mouse)
Band	3 G3|3 58.5 cM	Start	129,471,214 bp
Band	3 G3|3 58.5 cM	End	129,548,965 bp
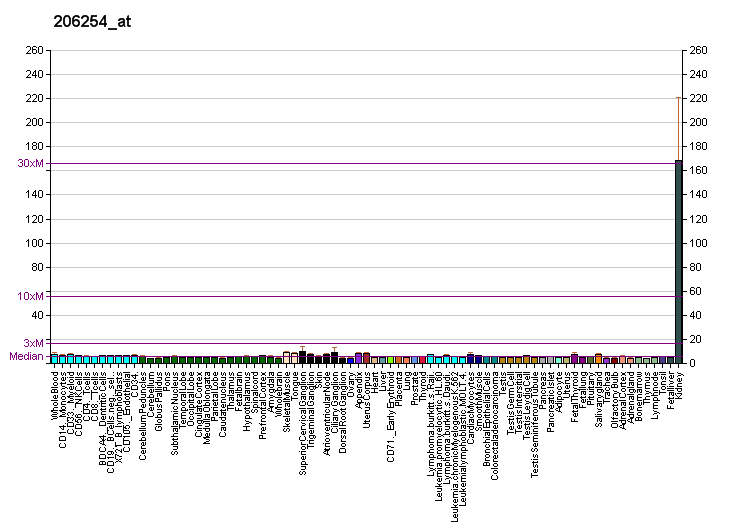
RNA expression pattern
Bgee	Human / Mouse (ortholog); Top expressed in: renal medulla; body of pancreas; muscle of thigh; human kidney; kidney tubule; gastrocnemius muscle; Skeletal muscle tissue of rectus abdominis; biceps brachii; deltoid muscle; vastus lateralis muscle / Top expressed in: submandibular gland; human kidney; right kidney; parotid gland; vestibular membrane of cochlear duct; prostate; lobe of prostate; extensor digitorum longus muscle; plantaris muscle; vastus lateralis muscle; More reference expression data
BioGPS	More reference expression data
Gene ontology
Molecular function	calcium ion binding; transmembrane receptor protein tyrosine kinase activator activity; epidermal growth factor receptor binding; Wnt-protein binding; protein binding; growth factor activity; Wnt-activated receptor activity; protein tyrosine kinase activity; phosphatidylinositol-4,5-bisphosphate 3-kinase activity
Cellular component	integral component of membrane; membrane; receptor complex; extracellular region; lysosomal membrane; extracellular exosome; platelet alpha granule lumen; extracellular space; clathrin-coated vesicle membrane; plasma membrane
Biological process	negative regulation of epidermal growth factor receptor signaling pathway; positive regulation of MAP kinase activity; epidermal growth factor receptor signaling pathway; regulation of protein localization to cell surface; ERK1 and ERK2 cascade; platelet degranulation; regulation of calcium ion import; mammary gland alveolus development; MAPK cascade; DNA replication; positive regulation of transcription, DNA-templated; negative regulation of secretion; positive regulation of hyaluronan biosynthetic process; positive regulation of peptidyl-threonine phosphorylation; positive regulation of ubiquitin-dependent protein catabolic process; angiogenesis; Wnt signaling pathway involved in dorsal/ventral axis specification; positive regulation of cell population proliferation; positive regulation of peptidyl-tyrosine phosphorylation; positive regulation of cerebellar granule cell precursor proliferation; canonical Wnt signaling pathway; negative regulation of cholesterol efflux; peptidyl-tyrosine phosphorylation; positive regulation of DNA binding; positive regulation of phosphorylation; positive regulation of mitotic nuclear division; branching morphogenesis of an epithelial tube; signal transduction; regulation of peptidyl-tyrosine phosphorylation; ERBB2 signaling pathway; phosphatidylinositol phosphate biosynthetic process; positive regulation of protein tyrosine kinase activity; activation of transmembrane receptor protein tyrosine kinase activity; regulation of cell motility; positive regulation of receptor internalization; positive regulation of epidermal growth factor-activated receptor activity; membrane organization; negative regulation of ERBB signaling pathway; embryonic retina morphogenesis in camera-type eye; positive regulation of gene expression; positive regulation of cell migration; positive regulation of protein kinase B signaling; negative regulation of Notch signaling pathway; regulation of receptor signaling pathway via JAK-STAT; positive regulation of canonical Wnt signaling pathway; positive regulation of protein localization to early endosome
Sources:Amigo / QuickGO
Orthologs
Databases	NCBI: entry; OMA: entry
Species	Human	Mouse
Entrez	1950	13645
Ensembl	ENSG00000138798	ENSMUSG00000028017
UniProt	P01133	P01132
RefSeq (mRNA)	NM_001178130; NM_001178131; NM_001963; NM_001357021	NM_010113; NM_001310737; NM_001329594
RefSeq (protein)	NP_001171601; NP_001171602; NP_001954; NP_001343950	NP_001297666; NP_001316523; NP_034243
Location (UCSC)	Chr 4: 109.91 – 110.01 Mb	Chr 3: 129.47 – 129.55 Mb
PubMed search
- Wikidata
View/Edit Human	View/Edit Mouse

A protein found on the cell surface of some cells that binds to the epidermal growth factor protein. Epidermal growth factor receptor is involved in cellular pathways that control cell division and survival.

Epidermal growth factor (EGF) is a protein that stimulates cell growth and differentiation by binding to its receptor, EGFR. Human EGF is 6-kDa and has 53 amino acid residues and three intramolecular disulfide bonds.

EGF was originally described as a secreted peptide found in the submaxillary glands of mice and in human urine. EGF has since been found in many human tissues, including platelets, submandibular gland (submaxillary gland), and parotid gland. Initially, human EGF was known as urogastrone.

== Structure ==
In humans, EGF has 53 amino acids (sequence NSDSECPLSHDGYCLHDGVCMYIEALDKYACNCVVGYIGERCQYRDLKWWELR), with a molecular mass of around 6 kDa. It contains three disulfide bridges (Cys6-Cys20, Cys14-Cys31, Cys33-Cys42).

== Function ==
EGF, via binding to its cognate receptor, results in cellular proliferation, differentiation, and survival.

Salivary EGF, which seems to be regulated by dietary inorganic iodine, also plays an important physiological role in the maintenance of oro-esophageal and gastric tissue integrity. The biological effects of salivary EGF include healing of oral and gastroesophageal ulcers, inhibition of gastric acid secretion, stimulation of DNA synthesis as well as mucosal protection from intraluminal injurious factors such as gastric acid, bile acids, pepsin, and trypsin and to physical, chemical and bacterial agents.

== Biological sources ==
The Epidermal growth factor can be found in platelets, urine, saliva, milk, tears, and blood plasma. It can also be found in the submandibular glands, and the parotid gland. The production of EGF has been found to be stimulated by testosterone.

== Mechanism ==
Diagram showing key components of the MAPK/ERK pathway. In the diagram, "P" represents phosphate. Note EGF at the very top.

EGF acts by binding with high affinity to epidermal growth factor receptor (EGFR) on the cell surface. This stimulates ligand-induced dimerization, activating the intrinsic protein-tyrosine kinase activity of the receptor (see the second diagram). The tyrosine kinase activity, in turn, initiates a signal transduction cascade that results in a variety of biochemical changes within the cell – a rise in intracellular calcium levels, increased glycolysis and protein synthesis, and increases in the expression of certain genes including the gene for EGFR – that ultimately lead to DNA synthesis and cell proliferation.

== EGF-family / EGF-like domain ==
EGF is the founding member of the EGF-family of proteins. Members of this protein family have highly similar structural and functional characteristics. Besides EGF itself other family members include:

- Heparin-binding EGF-like growth factor (HB-EGF)
- transforming growth factor-α (TGF-α)
- Amphiregulin (AR)
- Epiregulin (EPR)
- Epigen
- Betacellulin (BTC)
- neuregulin-1 (NRG1)
- neuregulin-2 (NRG2)
- neuregulin-3 (NRG3)
- neuregulin-4 (NRG4).

All family members contain one or more repeats of the conserved amino acid sequence:

CX_{7}CX_{4-5}CX_{10-13}CXCX_{8}GXRC

Where C is cysteine, G is glycine, R is arginine, and X represents any amino acid.

This sequence contains six cysteine residues that form three intramolecular disulfide bonds. Disulfide bond formation generates three structural loops that are essential for high-affinity binding between members of the EGF-family and their cell-surface receptors.

== Interactions ==
Epidermal growth factor has been shown to interact with epidermal growth factor receptors.

== Medical uses ==
Recombinant human epidermal growth factor, sold under the brand name Heberprot-P, is used to treat diabetic foot ulcers. It can be given by injection into the wound site, or may be used topically. Tentative evidence shows improved wound healing. Safety has been poorly studied.

EGF is used to modify synthetic scaffolds for manufacturing of bioengineered grafts by emulsion electrospinning or surface modification methods.

=== Bone regeneration ===
EGF plays an enhancer role on the osteogenic differentiation of dental pulp stem cells (DPSCs) because it is capable of increasing extracellular matrix mineralization. A low concentration of EGF (10 ng/ml) is sufficient to induce morphological and phenotypic changes. These data suggests that DPSCs in combination with EGF could be an effective stem cell-based therapy to bone tissue engineering applications in periodontics and oral implantology.

== History ==
EGF was the second growth factor to be identified. Initially, human EGF was known as urogastrone. Stanley Cohen discovered EGF while working with Rita Levi-Montalcini at the Washington University in St. Louis during experiments researching nerve growth factor. For these discoveries Levi-Montalcini and Cohen were awarded the 1986 Nobel Prize in Physiology or Medicine.
