= List of minor planets: 593001–594000 =

The following is a partial list of minor planets, running from minor-planet number 593001 through 594000, inclusive. The primary data for this and other partial lists is based on JPL's "Small-Body Orbital Elements" and data available from the Minor Planet Center. Critical list information is also provided by the MPC, unless otherwise specified from Lowell Observatory. A detailed description of the table's columns and additional sources are given on the main page including a complete list of every page in this series, and a statistical break-up on the dynamical classification of minor planets.

Also see the summary list of all named bodies in numerical and alphabetical order, and the corresponding naming citations for the number range of this particular list. New namings may only be added to this list after official publication, as the preannouncement of names is condemned by the Working Group for Small Bodies Nomenclature of the International Astronomical Union.

| Near-Earth obj. | MBA (inner) | MBA (outer) | Centaur |
| Mars-crosser | MBA (middle) | Jupiter trojan | Trans-Neptunian obj. |
| Unclassified |

== 593001–593100 ==
| Designation | | | Discovery | | | Properties | | Ref |
| Permanent | Provisional | Named after | Date | Site | Discoverer(s) | Category | Diam. | Ref |
|---|---|---|---|---|---|---|---|---|
| 593001 | 2015 FX_{178} | — | February 16, 2015 | Haleakala | Pan-STARRS 1 | · | 1.3 km | MPC · JPL |
| 593002 | 2015 FF_{180} | — | October 8, 2008 | Mount Lemmon | Mount Lemmon Survey | · | 1.4 km | MPC · JPL |
| 593003 | 2015 FE_{183} | — | October 31, 2013 | Mount Lemmon | Mount Lemmon Survey | · | 1.0 km | MPC · JPL |
| 593004 | 2015 FW_{184} | — | February 23, 2007 | Kitt Peak | Spacewatch | · | 1.4 km | MPC · JPL |
| 593005 | 2015 FC_{186} | — | March 22, 2015 | Haleakala | Pan-STARRS 1 | (194) | 1.8 km | MPC · JPL |
| 593006 | 2015 FL_{187} | — | January 23, 2015 | Haleakala | Pan-STARRS 1 | EUN | 1.1 km | MPC · JPL |
| 593007 | 2015 FX_{187} | — | June 17, 2012 | Kitt Peak | Spacewatch | · | 1.2 km | MPC · JPL |
| 593008 | 2015 FW_{188} | — | December 3, 2013 | Haleakala | Pan-STARRS 1 | · | 1.5 km | MPC · JPL |
| 593009 | 2015 FY_{190} | — | January 10, 2010 | Kitt Peak | Spacewatch | · | 1.6 km | MPC · JPL |
| 593010 | 2015 FH_{191} | — | March 22, 2015 | Haleakala | Pan-STARRS 1 | · | 1.1 km | MPC · JPL |
| 593011 | 2015 FL_{194} | — | February 24, 2015 | Haleakala | Pan-STARRS 1 | · | 1.6 km | MPC · JPL |
| 593012 | 2015 FP_{196} | — | February 22, 2015 | Haleakala | Pan-STARRS 1 | · | 1.3 km | MPC · JPL |
| 593013 | 2015 FH_{199} | — | February 25, 2015 | Haleakala | Pan-STARRS 1 | · | 1.4 km | MPC · JPL |
| 593014 | 2015 FC_{201} | — | February 16, 2015 | Haleakala | Pan-STARRS 1 | · | 1.4 km | MPC · JPL |
| 593015 | 2015 FG_{202} | — | November 6, 2013 | Haleakala | Pan-STARRS 1 | · | 1.1 km | MPC · JPL |
| 593016 | 2015 FH_{204} | — | August 28, 2013 | Catalina | CSS | · | 1.5 km | MPC · JPL |
| 593017 | 2015 FP_{206} | — | October 2, 2008 | Kitt Peak | Spacewatch | · | 1.4 km | MPC · JPL |
| 593018 | 2015 FJ_{208} | — | January 31, 2006 | Kitt Peak | Spacewatch | · | 1.3 km | MPC · JPL |
| 593019 | 2015 FL_{212} | — | April 26, 2007 | Mount Lemmon | Mount Lemmon Survey | MAR | 890 m | MPC · JPL |
| 593020 | 2015 FY_{212} | — | October 17, 2010 | Mount Lemmon | Mount Lemmon Survey | L4 | 7.0 km | MPC · JPL |
| 593021 | 2015 FO_{213} | — | October 23, 2003 | Apache Point | SDSS Collaboration | H | 460 m | MPC · JPL |
| 593022 | 2015 FG_{216} | — | August 15, 2004 | Palomar | NEAT | · | 1.9 km | MPC · JPL |
| 593023 | 2015 FD_{217} | — | September 9, 2002 | Palomar | NEAT | TIN | 1.1 km | MPC · JPL |
| 593024 | 2015 FT_{220} | — | January 10, 2006 | Mount Lemmon | Mount Lemmon Survey | · | 1 km | MPC · JPL |
| 593025 | 2015 FW_{220} | — | January 23, 2015 | Haleakala | Pan-STARRS 1 | · | 1.4 km | MPC · JPL |
| 593026 | 2015 FB_{221} | — | May 3, 2011 | Mount Lemmon | Mount Lemmon Survey | · | 1.6 km | MPC · JPL |
| 593027 | 2015 FL_{225} | — | April 4, 2011 | Kitt Peak | Spacewatch | · | 1.5 km | MPC · JPL |
| 593028 | 2015 FY_{231} | — | September 14, 2012 | Catalina | CSS | · | 1.6 km | MPC · JPL |
| 593029 | 2015 FD_{234} | — | October 6, 2008 | Kitt Peak | Spacewatch | · | 1.5 km | MPC · JPL |
| 593030 | 2015 FH_{234} | — | April 6, 2011 | Mount Lemmon | Mount Lemmon Survey | · | 1.5 km | MPC · JPL |
| 593031 | 2015 FL_{241} | — | January 21, 2015 | Haleakala | Pan-STARRS 1 | · | 1.7 km | MPC · JPL |
| 593032 | 2015 FY_{242} | — | January 23, 2015 | Haleakala | Pan-STARRS 1 | MAR | 820 m | MPC · JPL |
| 593033 | 2015 FY_{247} | — | November 10, 2004 | Kitt Peak | Spacewatch | · | 1.6 km | MPC · JPL |
| 593034 | 2015 FG_{258} | — | November 13, 2010 | Pla D'Arguines | R. Ferrando, Ferrando, M. | L4 | 6.9 km | MPC · JPL |
| 593035 | 2015 FR_{262} | — | December 25, 2005 | Kitt Peak | Spacewatch | · | 1.4 km | MPC · JPL |
| 593036 | 2015 FL_{265} | — | April 22, 2007 | Mount Lemmon | Mount Lemmon Survey | · | 1.5 km | MPC · JPL |
| 593037 | 2015 FU_{265} | — | September 6, 2008 | Catalina | CSS | · | 1.3 km | MPC · JPL |
| 593038 | 2015 FF_{266} | — | October 25, 2013 | Mount Lemmon | Mount Lemmon Survey | · | 1.3 km | MPC · JPL |
| 593039 | 2015 FP_{266} | — | April 9, 2002 | Kitt Peak | Spacewatch | EUN | 1.1 km | MPC · JPL |
| 593040 | 2015 FQ_{268} | — | November 24, 2009 | Kitt Peak | Spacewatch | · | 1.1 km | MPC · JPL |
| 593041 | 2015 FE_{272} | — | January 21, 2015 | Haleakala | Pan-STARRS 1 | · | 1.3 km | MPC · JPL |
| 593042 | 2015 FJ_{275} | — | April 14, 2011 | Mount Lemmon | Mount Lemmon Survey | · | 1.5 km | MPC · JPL |
| 593043 | 2015 FW_{277} | — | September 22, 2008 | Kitt Peak | Spacewatch | · | 1.3 km | MPC · JPL |
| 593044 | 2015 FH_{279} | — | February 18, 2015 | Haleakala | Pan-STARRS 1 | · | 1.4 km | MPC · JPL |
| 593045 | 2015 FV_{279} | — | February 17, 2015 | Haleakala | Pan-STARRS 1 | · | 1.6 km | MPC · JPL |
| 593046 | 2015 FL_{280} | — | March 24, 2015 | Haleakala | Pan-STARRS 1 | · | 1.4 km | MPC · JPL |
| 593047 | 2015 FR_{280} | — | December 29, 2014 | Haleakala | Pan-STARRS 1 | EUN | 1.1 km | MPC · JPL |
| 593048 | 2015 FY_{290} | — | January 19, 2015 | Haleakala | Pan-STARRS 1 | · | 1.5 km | MPC · JPL |
| 593049 | 2015 FV_{291} | — | April 12, 2011 | Mount Lemmon | Mount Lemmon Survey | · | 1.4 km | MPC · JPL |
| 593050 | 2015 FC_{292} | — | November 29, 2013 | Mount Lemmon | Mount Lemmon Survey | · | 1.6 km | MPC · JPL |
| 593051 | 2015 FR_{292} | — | November 26, 2013 | Haleakala | Pan-STARRS 1 | · | 1.3 km | MPC · JPL |
| 593052 | 2015 FJ_{299} | — | April 26, 2007 | Mount Lemmon | Mount Lemmon Survey | H | 420 m | MPC · JPL |
| 593053 | 2015 FV_{299} | — | January 16, 2005 | Kitt Peak | Spacewatch | · | 2.1 km | MPC · JPL |
| 593054 | 2015 FN_{300} | — | March 28, 2015 | Haleakala | Pan-STARRS 1 | · | 2.0 km | MPC · JPL |
| 593055 | 2015 FO_{305} | — | February 27, 2015 | Haleakala | Pan-STARRS 1 | H | 380 m | MPC · JPL |
| 593056 | 2015 FA_{307} | — | September 28, 2008 | Mount Lemmon | Mount Lemmon Survey | · | 1.6 km | MPC · JPL |
| 593057 | 2015 FK_{307} | — | January 17, 2013 | Kitt Peak | Spacewatch | L4 | 10 km | MPC · JPL |
| 593058 | 2015 FP_{307} | — | September 23, 2008 | Mount Lemmon | Mount Lemmon Survey | · | 2.1 km | MPC · JPL |
| 593059 | 2015 FM_{308} | — | March 23, 2015 | Haleakala | Pan-STARRS 1 | · | 1.6 km | MPC · JPL |
| 593060 | 2015 FY_{312} | — | August 21, 2004 | Siding Spring | SSS | · | 1.4 km | MPC · JPL |
| 593061 | 2015 FU_{315} | — | March 25, 2015 | Haleakala | Pan-STARRS 1 | · | 1.3 km | MPC · JPL |
| 593062 | 2015 FP_{316} | — | March 22, 2015 | Kitt Peak | Spacewatch | · | 1.8 km | MPC · JPL |
| 593063 | 2015 FT_{320} | — | March 25, 2015 | Haleakala | Pan-STARRS 1 | · | 1.5 km | MPC · JPL |
| 593064 | 2015 FY_{321} | — | March 25, 2015 | Haleakala | Pan-STARRS 1 | · | 1.4 km | MPC · JPL |
| 593065 | 2015 FL_{322} | — | February 2, 2006 | Kitt Peak | Spacewatch | · | 1.6 km | MPC · JPL |
| 593066 | 2015 FX_{323} | — | January 21, 2014 | Mount Lemmon | Mount Lemmon Survey | · | 1.7 km | MPC · JPL |
| 593067 | 2015 FM_{324} | — | October 9, 2012 | Catalina | CSS | · | 2.1 km | MPC · JPL |
| 593068 | 2015 FN_{329} | — | March 25, 2015 | Haleakala | Pan-STARRS 1 | · | 1.4 km | MPC · JPL |
| 593069 | 2015 FX_{330} | — | February 28, 2006 | Mount Lemmon | Mount Lemmon Survey | · | 1.6 km | MPC · JPL |
| 593070 | 2015 FF_{332} | — | March 28, 2015 | Haleakala | Pan-STARRS 1 | H | 570 m | MPC · JPL |
| 593071 | 2015 FN_{332} | — | March 27, 2015 | Haleakala | Pan-STARRS 1 | H | 540 m | MPC · JPL |
| 593072 | 2015 FA_{333} | — | February 20, 2015 | Haleakala | Pan-STARRS 1 | · | 2.0 km | MPC · JPL |
| 593073 | 2015 FU_{339} | — | June 23, 1995 | Kitt Peak | Spacewatch | EUN | 1.2 km | MPC · JPL |
| 593074 | 2015 FJ_{342} | — | October 24, 2008 | Mount Lemmon | Mount Lemmon Survey | H | 540 m | MPC · JPL |
| 593075 | 2015 FY_{346} | — | January 17, 2015 | Haleakala | Pan-STARRS 1 | EUN | 1.0 km | MPC · JPL |
| 593076 | 2015 FC_{350} | — | December 17, 2009 | Kitt Peak | Spacewatch | MAR | 930 m | MPC · JPL |
| 593077 | 2015 FS_{355} | — | March 17, 2015 | Haleakala | Pan-STARRS 1 | · | 1.3 km | MPC · JPL |
| 593078 | 2015 FG_{356} | — | September 19, 2003 | Kitt Peak | Spacewatch | · | 1.5 km | MPC · JPL |
| 593079 | 2015 FN_{356} | — | April 19, 2006 | Kitt Peak | Spacewatch | · | 1.6 km | MPC · JPL |
| 593080 | 2015 FD_{357} | — | November 14, 1998 | Kitt Peak | Spacewatch | L4 | 8.7 km | MPC · JPL |
| 593081 | 2015 FO_{360} | — | March 17, 2015 | Haleakala | Pan-STARRS 1 | · | 1.2 km | MPC · JPL |
| 593082 | 2015 FY_{361} | — | October 8, 2008 | Kitt Peak | Spacewatch | AEO | 1.0 km | MPC · JPL |
| 593083 | 2015 FC_{366} | — | January 18, 2015 | Haleakala | Pan-STARRS 1 | · | 1.3 km | MPC · JPL |
| 593084 | 2015 FN_{366} | — | January 26, 2015 | Haleakala | Pan-STARRS 1 | · | 1.7 km | MPC · JPL |
| 593085 | 2015 FH_{369} | — | January 20, 2015 | Haleakala | Pan-STARRS 1 | H | 410 m | MPC · JPL |
| 593086 | 2015 FV_{369} | — | November 9, 2013 | Haleakala | Pan-STARRS 1 | · | 1.3 km | MPC · JPL |
| 593087 | 2015 FQ_{370} | — | January 17, 2013 | Haleakala | Pan-STARRS 1 | L4 | 7.0 km | MPC · JPL |
| 593088 | 2015 FK_{371} | — | July 30, 2008 | Mount Lemmon | Mount Lemmon Survey | L4 | 8.3 km | MPC · JPL |
| 593089 | 2015 FD_{374} | — | September 11, 2007 | Mount Lemmon | Mount Lemmon Survey | KOR | 1.2 km | MPC · JPL |
| 593090 | 2015 FL_{374} | — | October 8, 2012 | Haleakala | Pan-STARRS 1 | HOF | 2.5 km | MPC · JPL |
| 593091 | 2015 FH_{378} | — | March 20, 2015 | Haleakala | Pan-STARRS 1 | · | 1.6 km | MPC · JPL |
| 593092 | 2015 FB_{385} | — | January 25, 2006 | Kitt Peak | Spacewatch | EUN | 1.3 km | MPC · JPL |
| 593093 | 2015 FF_{385} | — | April 16, 2007 | Mount Lemmon | Mount Lemmon Survey | · | 1.3 km | MPC · JPL |
| 593094 | 2015 FS_{386} | — | January 22, 2015 | Haleakala | Pan-STARRS 1 | L4 | 7.8 km | MPC · JPL |
| 593095 | 2015 FW_{388} | — | September 23, 2008 | Kitt Peak | Spacewatch | · | 1.4 km | MPC · JPL |
| 593096 | 2015 FW_{389} | — | October 11, 2012 | Haleakala | Pan-STARRS 1 | · | 1.6 km | MPC · JPL |
| 593097 | 2015 FO_{393} | — | February 26, 2014 | Mount Lemmon | Mount Lemmon Survey | L4 | 7.4 km | MPC · JPL |
| 593098 | 2015 FK_{402} | — | February 9, 2005 | La Silla | Vuissoz, C., Bourban, G. | · | 1.7 km | MPC · JPL |
| 593099 | 2015 FT_{404} | — | December 18, 2009 | Mount Lemmon | Mount Lemmon Survey | · | 1.2 km | MPC · JPL |
| 593100 | 2015 FO_{410} | — | January 22, 2015 | Haleakala | Pan-STARRS 1 | · | 1.4 km | MPC · JPL |

== 593101–593200 ==
back to top

| Designation | | | Discovery | | | Properties | | Ref |
| Permanent | Provisional | Named after | Date | Site | Discoverer(s) | Category | Diam. | Ref |
|---|---|---|---|---|---|---|---|---|
| 593101 | 2015 FH_{412} | — | October 22, 2003 | Apache Point | SDSS Collaboration | · | 1.6 km | MPC · JPL |
| 593102 | 2015 FK_{412} | — | March 28, 2015 | Haleakala | Pan-STARRS 1 | BRA | 1.1 km | MPC · JPL |
| 593103 | 2015 FQ_{414} | — | March 17, 2015 | Haleakala | Pan-STARRS 1 | · | 1.6 km | MPC · JPL |
| 593104 | 2015 FN_{418} | — | March 28, 2015 | Haleakala | Pan-STARRS 1 | H | 430 m | MPC · JPL |
| 593105 | 2015 FL_{421} | — | March 22, 2015 | Haleakala | Pan-STARRS 1 | · | 1.6 km | MPC · JPL |
| 593106 | 2015 FV_{425} | — | February 24, 2014 | Haleakala | Pan-STARRS 1 | L4 | 6.5 km | MPC · JPL |
| 593107 | 2015 FW_{425} | — | March 17, 2015 | Mount Lemmon | Mount Lemmon Survey | · | 1.6 km | MPC · JPL |
| 593108 | 2015 FD_{427} | — | March 21, 2015 | Haleakala | Pan-STARRS 1 | · | 1.5 km | MPC · JPL |
| 593109 | 2015 FH_{427} | — | March 25, 2015 | Haleakala | Pan-STARRS 1 | L4 | 6.7 km | MPC · JPL |
| 593110 | 2015 FX_{428} | — | October 31, 2008 | Kitt Peak | Spacewatch | · | 1.4 km | MPC · JPL |
| 593111 | 2015 FR_{430} | — | March 22, 2015 | Mount Lemmon | Mount Lemmon Survey | · | 1.5 km | MPC · JPL |
| 593112 | 2015 FD_{431} | — | March 31, 2015 | Haleakala | Pan-STARRS 1 | · | 1.3 km | MPC · JPL |
| 593113 | 2015 FE_{440} | — | March 22, 2015 | Haleakala | Pan-STARRS 1 | L4 | 9.0 km | MPC · JPL |
| 593114 | 2015 FS_{441} | — | March 22, 2015 | Mount Lemmon | Mount Lemmon Survey | L4 | 5.6 km | MPC · JPL |
| 593115 | 2015 FJ_{446} | — | January 23, 2015 | Haleakala | Pan-STARRS 1 | · | 1.3 km | MPC · JPL |
| 593116 | 2015 FR_{446} | — | January 10, 2013 | Kitt Peak | Spacewatch | L4 | 6.8 km | MPC · JPL |
| 593117 | 2015 FT_{447} | — | March 22, 2015 | Haleakala | Pan-STARRS 1 | · | 1.5 km | MPC · JPL |
| 593118 | 2015 FK_{449} | — | March 25, 2015 | Haleakala | Pan-STARRS 1 | · | 1.5 km | MPC · JPL |
| 593119 | 2015 GN | — | August 7, 2005 | Siding Spring | SSS | H | 700 m | MPC · JPL |
| 593120 | 2015 GJ_{2} | — | January 19, 2015 | Haleakala | Pan-STARRS 1 | · | 1.4 km | MPC · JPL |
| 593121 | 2015 GP_{2} | — | December 20, 2014 | Haleakala | Pan-STARRS 1 | H | 440 m | MPC · JPL |
| 593122 | 2015 GH_{4} | — | March 27, 2015 | Kitt Peak | Spacewatch | EUN | 1.1 km | MPC · JPL |
| 593123 | 2015 GD_{7} | — | October 18, 2012 | Haleakala | Pan-STARRS 1 | · | 1.9 km | MPC · JPL |
| 593124 | 2015 GJ_{8} | — | April 18, 1998 | Kitt Peak | Spacewatch | EUN | 1.1 km | MPC · JPL |
| 593125 | 2015 GL_{8} | — | March 17, 2015 | Haleakala | Pan-STARRS 1 | · | 1.7 km | MPC · JPL |
| 593126 | 2015 GR_{9} | — | August 14, 2012 | Siding Spring | SSS | EUN | 1.4 km | MPC · JPL |
| 593127 | 2015 GV_{9} | — | May 1, 2011 | Haleakala | Pan-STARRS 1 | · | 1.7 km | MPC · JPL |
| 593128 | 2015 GB_{12} | — | March 29, 2015 | Mount Lemmon | Mount Lemmon Survey | · | 1.3 km | MPC · JPL |
| 593129 | 2015 GG_{16} | — | September 29, 2009 | Kitt Peak | Spacewatch | L4 | 7.0 km | MPC · JPL |
| 593130 | 2015 GK_{20} | — | August 26, 2000 | Cerro Tololo | Deep Ecliptic Survey | · | 1.0 km | MPC · JPL |
| 593131 | 2015 GV_{21} | — | March 21, 2015 | Haleakala | Pan-STARRS 1 | · | 1.1 km | MPC · JPL |
| 593132 | 2015 GQ_{22} | — | March 31, 2003 | Apache Point | SDSS Collaboration | L4 | 8.6 km | MPC · JPL |
| 593133 | 2015 GM_{25} | — | September 19, 2003 | Anderson Mesa | LONEOS | · | 2.5 km | MPC · JPL |
| 593134 | 2015 GH_{26} | — | September 3, 2013 | Haleakala | Pan-STARRS 1 | H | 390 m | MPC · JPL |
| 593135 | 2015 GQ_{32} | — | November 27, 2009 | Mount Lemmon | Mount Lemmon Survey | EUN | 1.1 km | MPC · JPL |
| 593136 | 2015 GA_{35} | — | October 17, 2012 | Haleakala | Pan-STARRS 1 | · | 1.7 km | MPC · JPL |
| 593137 | 2015 GD_{35} | — | December 3, 2005 | Mauna Kea | A. Boattini | · | 1.3 km | MPC · JPL |
| 593138 | 2015 GC_{36} | — | January 14, 2002 | Kitt Peak | Spacewatch | · | 1.4 km | MPC · JPL |
| 593139 | 2015 GO_{37} | — | March 27, 2015 | Haleakala | Pan-STARRS 1 | · | 1.5 km | MPC · JPL |
| 593140 | 2015 GR_{38} | — | February 10, 2014 | Haleakala | Pan-STARRS 1 | L4 | 7.0 km | MPC · JPL |
| 593141 | 2015 GK_{42} | — | November 9, 2013 | Kitt Peak | Spacewatch | · | 1.6 km | MPC · JPL |
| 593142 | 2015 GP_{43} | — | November 24, 2013 | Haleakala | Pan-STARRS 1 | · | 1.0 km | MPC · JPL |
| 593143 | 2015 GW_{46} | — | October 25, 2008 | Catalina | CSS | · | 1.7 km | MPC · JPL |
| 593144 | 2015 GQ_{47} | — | March 21, 2015 | Haleakala | Pan-STARRS 1 | NEM | 1.7 km | MPC · JPL |
| 593145 | 2015 GS_{47} | — | September 19, 2003 | Kitt Peak | Spacewatch | · | 1.7 km | MPC · JPL |
| 593146 | 2015 GW_{47} | — | February 23, 2015 | Haleakala | Pan-STARRS 1 | · | 1.5 km | MPC · JPL |
| 593147 | 2015 GX_{47} | — | March 25, 2015 | Haleakala | Pan-STARRS 1 | GEF | 890 m | MPC · JPL |
| 593148 | 2015 GR_{59} | — | May 9, 2007 | Catalina | CSS | · | 1.3 km | MPC · JPL |
| 593149 | 2015 GV_{59} | — | April 13, 2015 | Haleakala | Pan-STARRS 1 | · | 1.4 km | MPC · JPL |
| 593150 | 2015 HV | — | September 27, 2003 | Kitt Peak | Spacewatch | H | 400 m | MPC · JPL |
| 593151 | 2015 HV_{2} | — | December 1, 2005 | Kitt Peak | Wasserman, L. H., Millis, R. L. | · | 1.6 km | MPC · JPL |
| 593152 | 2015 HN_{4} | — | April 26, 2011 | Kitt Peak | Spacewatch | · | 1.5 km | MPC · JPL |
| 593153 | 2015 HJ_{7} | — | September 4, 2008 | Kitt Peak | Spacewatch | · | 1.5 km | MPC · JPL |
| 593154 | 2015 HE_{8} | — | December 29, 2014 | Haleakala | Pan-STARRS 1 | · | 1.3 km | MPC · JPL |
| 593155 | 2015 HH_{8} | — | May 26, 1998 | Kitt Peak | Spacewatch | · | 1.8 km | MPC · JPL |
| 593156 | 2015 HO_{8} | — | September 15, 1991 | Kitt Peak | Spacewatch | · | 1.5 km | MPC · JPL |
| 593157 | 2015 HS_{8} | — | January 21, 2015 | Haleakala | Pan-STARRS 1 | · | 1.7 km | MPC · JPL |
| 593158 | 2015 HE_{9} | — | December 23, 2011 | Ka-Dar | Gerke, V. | H | 630 m | MPC · JPL |
| 593159 | 2015 HW_{16} | — | October 7, 2004 | Kitt Peak | Spacewatch | · | 1.3 km | MPC · JPL |
| 593160 | 2015 HG_{17} | — | April 9, 2015 | Mount Lemmon | Mount Lemmon Survey | AGN | 970 m | MPC · JPL |
| 593161 | 2015 HR_{18} | — | January 10, 2006 | Mount Lemmon | Mount Lemmon Survey | · | 1.2 km | MPC · JPL |
| 593162 | 2015 HW_{18} | — | October 8, 2012 | Mount Lemmon | Mount Lemmon Survey | · | 1.5 km | MPC · JPL |
| 593163 | 2015 HM_{19} | — | December 31, 2013 | Mount Lemmon | Mount Lemmon Survey | · | 1.5 km | MPC · JPL |
| 593164 | 2015 HV_{20} | — | December 15, 2009 | Catalina | CSS | (5) | 1.4 km | MPC · JPL |
| 593165 | 2015 HK_{21} | — | January 26, 2006 | Kitt Peak | Spacewatch | · | 1.6 km | MPC · JPL |
| 593166 | 2015 HU_{23} | — | April 17, 2015 | Mount Lemmon | Mount Lemmon Survey | AGN | 890 m | MPC · JPL |
| 593167 | 2015 HQ_{26} | — | September 26, 2003 | Apache Point | SDSS Collaboration | PAD | 1.3 km | MPC · JPL |
| 593168 | 2015 HD_{28} | — | March 1, 2011 | Kitt Peak | Spacewatch | · | 860 m | MPC · JPL |
| 593169 | 2015 HL_{28} | — | April 20, 2015 | Haleakala | Pan-STARRS 1 | · | 1.6 km | MPC · JPL |
| 593170 | 2015 HO_{29} | — | October 26, 2013 | Kitt Peak | Spacewatch | (5) | 1.1 km | MPC · JPL |
| 593171 | 2015 HO_{32} | — | May 6, 2006 | Mount Lemmon | Mount Lemmon Survey | · | 1.8 km | MPC · JPL |
| 593172 | 2015 HT_{34} | — | December 22, 2008 | Kitt Peak | Spacewatch | KOR | 1.3 km | MPC · JPL |
| 593173 | 2015 HB_{35} | — | February 14, 2010 | Mount Lemmon | Mount Lemmon Survey | · | 1.5 km | MPC · JPL |
| 593174 | 2015 HJ_{37} | — | March 18, 2015 | Haleakala | Pan-STARRS 1 | · | 1.7 km | MPC · JPL |
| 593175 | 2015 HV_{39} | — | April 25, 2007 | Mount Lemmon | Mount Lemmon Survey | · | 1.6 km | MPC · JPL |
| 593176 | 2015 HW_{42} | — | January 28, 2012 | Haleakala | Pan-STARRS 1 | L4 | 10 km | MPC · JPL |
| 593177 | 2015 HM_{46} | — | March 27, 2015 | Haleakala | Pan-STARRS 1 | · | 1.8 km | MPC · JPL |
| 593178 | 2015 HT_{48} | — | March 25, 2015 | Haleakala | Pan-STARRS 1 | · | 1.1 km | MPC · JPL |
| 593179 | 2015 HX_{48} | — | March 25, 2015 | Haleakala | Pan-STARRS 1 | · | 1.7 km | MPC · JPL |
| 593180 | 2015 HS_{50} | — | March 21, 2015 | Haleakala | Pan-STARRS 1 | · | 1.6 km | MPC · JPL |
| 593181 | 2015 HP_{51} | — | August 13, 2012 | Haleakala | Pan-STARRS 1 | · | 1.2 km | MPC · JPL |
| 593182 | 2015 HU_{51} | — | November 3, 2008 | Mount Lemmon | Mount Lemmon Survey | WIT | 1.0 km | MPC · JPL |
| 593183 | 2015 HK_{52} | — | March 4, 2006 | Kitt Peak | Spacewatch | · | 1.5 km | MPC · JPL |
| 593184 | 2015 HN_{53} | — | April 12, 2011 | Catalina | CSS | · | 1.8 km | MPC · JPL |
| 593185 | 2015 HS_{58} | — | October 22, 2008 | Mount Lemmon | Mount Lemmon Survey | H | 400 m | MPC · JPL |
| 593186 | 2015 HR_{59} | — | March 22, 2015 | Haleakala | Pan-STARRS 1 | · | 2.0 km | MPC · JPL |
| 593187 | 2015 HG_{61} | — | December 4, 2013 | Haleakala | Pan-STARRS 1 | · | 2.2 km | MPC · JPL |
| 593188 | 2015 HG_{65} | — | November 21, 2001 | Apache Point | SDSS Collaboration | · | 1.0 km | MPC · JPL |
| 593189 | 2015 HS_{65} | — | April 23, 2015 | Haleakala | Pan-STARRS 1 | PAD | 1.2 km | MPC · JPL |
| 593190 | 2015 HE_{68} | — | September 21, 2012 | Kitt Peak | Spacewatch | KOR | 1.1 km | MPC · JPL |
| 593191 | 2015 HM_{70} | — | April 23, 2015 | Haleakala | Pan-STARRS 1 | KOR | 920 m | MPC · JPL |
| 593192 | 2015 HO_{71} | — | September 21, 2003 | Kitt Peak | Spacewatch | · | 1.6 km | MPC · JPL |
| 593193 | 2015 HN_{73} | — | January 21, 2014 | Mount Lemmon | Mount Lemmon Survey | KOR | 1.1 km | MPC · JPL |
| 593194 | 2015 HA_{75} | — | October 6, 2012 | Mount Lemmon | Mount Lemmon Survey | · | 1.8 km | MPC · JPL |
| 593195 Lavinaahmed | 2015 HR_{75} | Lavinaahmed | December 6, 2012 | Tincana | M. Kusiak, M. Żołnowski | · | 980 m | MPC · JPL |
| 593196 | 2015 HQ_{77} | — | February 14, 2010 | Mount Lemmon | Mount Lemmon Survey | · | 1.6 km | MPC · JPL |
| 593197 | 2015 HH_{79} | — | October 15, 2009 | Mount Lemmon | Mount Lemmon Survey | · | 1.1 km | MPC · JPL |
| 593198 | 2015 HE_{85} | — | April 23, 2015 | Haleakala | Pan-STARRS 1 | · | 1.5 km | MPC · JPL |
| 593199 | 2015 HN_{86} | — | April 26, 2011 | Bergisch Gladbach | W. Bickel | · | 2.0 km | MPC · JPL |
| 593200 | 2015 HW_{88} | — | May 19, 2006 | Mount Lemmon | Mount Lemmon Survey | · | 1.7 km | MPC · JPL |

== 593201–593300 ==
back to top

| Designation | | | Discovery | | | Properties | | Ref |
| Permanent | Provisional | Named after | Date | Site | Discoverer(s) | Category | Diam. | Ref |
|---|---|---|---|---|---|---|---|---|
| 593201 | 2015 HP_{89} | — | October 14, 2012 | Kitt Peak | Spacewatch | · | 1.8 km | MPC · JPL |
| 593202 | 2015 HL_{95} | — | April 23, 2015 | Haleakala | Pan-STARRS 1 | · | 1.5 km | MPC · JPL |
| 593203 | 2015 HO_{101} | — | September 9, 2007 | Kitt Peak | Spacewatch | MRX | 880 m | MPC · JPL |
| 593204 | 2015 HJ_{104} | — | November 17, 2009 | Mount Lemmon | Mount Lemmon Survey | · | 1.5 km | MPC · JPL |
| 593205 | 2015 HN_{105} | — | February 1, 2005 | Kitt Peak | Spacewatch | · | 1.7 km | MPC · JPL |
| 593206 | 2015 HB_{106} | — | February 23, 2015 | Haleakala | Pan-STARRS 1 | · | 1.3 km | MPC · JPL |
| 593207 | 2015 HQ_{110} | — | January 5, 2006 | Mount Lemmon | Mount Lemmon Survey | · | 1.5 km | MPC · JPL |
| 593208 | 2015 HR_{110} | — | March 25, 2015 | Haleakala | Pan-STARRS 1 | MAR | 1 km | MPC · JPL |
| 593209 | 2015 HF_{114} | — | January 8, 2010 | Mount Lemmon | Mount Lemmon Survey | · | 1.8 km | MPC · JPL |
| 593210 | 2015 HS_{116} | — | March 22, 2015 | Haleakala | Pan-STARRS 1 | H | 460 m | MPC · JPL |
| 593211 | 2015 HK_{118} | — | October 2, 2003 | Kitt Peak | Spacewatch | · | 2.0 km | MPC · JPL |
| 593212 | 2015 HP_{118} | — | January 5, 2006 | Catalina | CSS | · | 970 m | MPC · JPL |
| 593213 | 2015 HF_{123} | — | October 23, 2012 | Mount Lemmon | Mount Lemmon Survey | HOF | 2.0 km | MPC · JPL |
| 593214 | 2015 HJ_{123} | — | October 17, 2012 | Haleakala | Pan-STARRS 1 | · | 1.3 km | MPC · JPL |
| 593215 | 2015 HA_{126} | — | April 23, 2015 | Haleakala | Pan-STARRS 1 | HOF | 2.0 km | MPC · JPL |
| 593216 | 2015 HR_{130} | — | April 23, 2015 | Haleakala | Pan-STARRS 1 | · | 1.5 km | MPC · JPL |
| 593217 | 2015 HA_{131} | — | December 1, 2008 | Kitt Peak | Spacewatch | AGN | 970 m | MPC · JPL |
| 593218 | 2015 HX_{131} | — | October 13, 2004 | Kitt Peak | Spacewatch | · | 1.3 km | MPC · JPL |
| 593219 | 2015 HH_{132} | — | October 18, 2012 | Haleakala | Pan-STARRS 1 | · | 1.6 km | MPC · JPL |
| 593220 | 2015 HR_{133} | — | September 14, 2007 | Mount Lemmon | Mount Lemmon Survey | · | 1.7 km | MPC · JPL |
| 593221 | 2015 HE_{134} | — | August 25, 2001 | Palomar | NEAT | · | 1.8 km | MPC · JPL |
| 593222 | 2015 HQ_{136} | — | April 15, 2007 | Kitt Peak | Spacewatch | · | 1.3 km | MPC · JPL |
| 593223 | 2015 HG_{143} | — | April 17, 2015 | Mount Lemmon | Mount Lemmon Survey | · | 1.3 km | MPC · JPL |
| 593224 | 2015 HE_{147} | — | September 4, 2011 | Haleakala | Pan-STARRS 1 | · | 1.5 km | MPC · JPL |
| 593225 | 2015 HA_{148} | — | September 29, 2003 | Kitt Peak | Spacewatch | WIT | 960 m | MPC · JPL |
| 593226 | 2015 HY_{152} | — | September 19, 1998 | Apache Point | SDSS | · | 1.7 km | MPC · JPL |
| 593227 | 2015 HD_{158} | — | January 22, 2006 | Mount Lemmon | Mount Lemmon Survey | · | 1.0 km | MPC · JPL |
| 593228 | 2015 HX_{163} | — | September 11, 2007 | Mount Lemmon | Mount Lemmon Survey | · | 1.6 km | MPC · JPL |
| 593229 | 2015 HR_{171} | — | April 28, 2015 | Mount Lemmon | Mount Lemmon Survey | L4 | 10 km | MPC · JPL |
| 593230 | 2015 HE_{174} | — | September 5, 2000 | Apache Point | SDSS Collaboration | · | 1.8 km | MPC · JPL |
| 593231 | 2015 HH_{183} | — | March 29, 2015 | Haleakala | Pan-STARRS 1 | · | 1.9 km | MPC · JPL |
| 593232 | 2015 HX_{183} | — | October 30, 2008 | Kitt Peak | Spacewatch | H | 330 m | MPC · JPL |
| 593233 | 2015 HA_{184} | — | December 22, 2008 | Mount Lemmon | Mount Lemmon Survey | H | 350 m | MPC · JPL |
| 593234 | 2015 HU_{184} | — | April 23, 2015 | Haleakala | Pan-STARRS 1 | KOR | 1.1 km | MPC · JPL |
| 593235 | 2015 HN_{187} | — | January 5, 2014 | Kitt Peak | Spacewatch | · | 1.4 km | MPC · JPL |
| 593236 | 2015 HW_{188} | — | December 7, 2013 | Nogales | M. Schwartz, P. R. Holvorcem | · | 1.6 km | MPC · JPL |
| 593237 | 2015 HY_{188} | — | November 9, 2013 | Mount Lemmon | Mount Lemmon Survey | · | 1.4 km | MPC · JPL |
| 593238 | 2015 HG_{190} | — | April 20, 2015 | Haleakala | Pan-STARRS 1 | · | 1.4 km | MPC · JPL |
| 593239 | 2015 HU_{191} | — | October 24, 2003 | Apache Point | SDSS Collaboration | · | 1.9 km | MPC · JPL |
| 593240 | 2015 HZ_{192} | — | April 25, 2015 | Haleakala | Pan-STARRS 1 | · | 1.4 km | MPC · JPL |
| 593241 | 2015 HD_{193} | — | April 25, 2015 | Haleakala | Pan-STARRS 1 | · | 1.4 km | MPC · JPL |
| 593242 | 2015 HA_{202} | — | April 24, 2015 | Haleakala | Pan-STARRS 1 | · | 1.4 km | MPC · JPL |
| 593243 | 2015 HG_{205} | — | April 23, 2015 | Haleakala | Pan-STARRS 1 | L4 | 7.2 km | MPC · JPL |
| 593244 | 2015 HN_{205} | — | September 26, 2017 | Haleakala | Pan-STARRS 1 | · | 1.4 km | MPC · JPL |
| 593245 | 2015 HL_{209} | — | April 25, 2015 | Haleakala | Pan-STARRS 1 | L4 | 5.7 km | MPC · JPL |
| 593246 | 2015 HV_{210} | — | April 25, 2015 | Haleakala | Pan-STARRS 1 | · | 1.4 km | MPC · JPL |
| 593247 | 2015 HE_{215} | — | April 20, 2015 | Haleakala | Pan-STARRS 1 | KOR | 1.0 km | MPC · JPL |
| 593248 | 2015 JX_{15} | — | May 14, 2015 | Haleakala | Pan-STARRS 1 | · | 1.9 km | MPC · JPL |
| 593249 | 2015 KL | — | November 19, 2003 | Palomar | NEAT | H | 460 m | MPC · JPL |
| 593250 | 2015 KU_{1} | — | March 11, 2011 | Mount Lemmon | Mount Lemmon Survey | · | 1.1 km | MPC · JPL |
| 593251 | 2015 KA_{4} | — | January 31, 2015 | Haleakala | Pan-STARRS 1 | · | 1.6 km | MPC · JPL |
| 593252 | 2015 KU_{14} | — | September 9, 2007 | Kitt Peak | Spacewatch | · | 2.0 km | MPC · JPL |
| 593253 | 2015 KJ_{15} | — | January 1, 2014 | Mount Lemmon | Mount Lemmon Survey | GEF | 1.1 km | MPC · JPL |
| 593254 | 2015 KM_{22} | — | March 31, 2015 | Haleakala | Pan-STARRS 1 | · | 1.9 km | MPC · JPL |
| 593255 | 2015 KP_{31} | — | January 17, 2000 | Mauna Kea | Veillet, C. | · | 2.0 km | MPC · JPL |
| 593256 | 2015 KQ_{35} | — | March 23, 2006 | Catalina | CSS | · | 1.5 km | MPC · JPL |
| 593257 | 2015 KJ_{37} | — | May 20, 2015 | Mount Lemmon | Mount Lemmon Survey | JUN | 920 m | MPC · JPL |
| 593258 | 2015 KO_{39} | — | May 13, 2015 | Cerro Paranal | Altmann, M., Prusti, T. | EOS | 1.4 km | MPC · JPL |
| 593259 | 2015 KD_{44} | — | October 19, 2012 | Mount Lemmon | Mount Lemmon Survey | BRA | 1.3 km | MPC · JPL |
| 593260 | 2015 KG_{44} | — | March 4, 2005 | Mount Lemmon | Mount Lemmon Survey | · | 1.5 km | MPC · JPL |
| 593261 | 2015 KP_{44} | — | November 19, 2003 | Kitt Peak | Spacewatch | · | 1.7 km | MPC · JPL |
| 593262 | 2015 KH_{45} | — | November 5, 2007 | Mount Lemmon | Mount Lemmon Survey | KOR | 1.3 km | MPC · JPL |
| 593263 | 2015 KQ_{51} | — | October 29, 2003 | Kitt Peak | Spacewatch | · | 2.0 km | MPC · JPL |
| 593264 | 2015 KM_{52} | — | May 20, 2015 | Haleakala | Pan-STARRS 1 | · | 1.4 km | MPC · JPL |
| 593265 | 2015 KZ_{53} | — | May 20, 2015 | Haleakala | Pan-STARRS 1 | · | 1.6 km | MPC · JPL |
| 593266 | 2015 KR_{68} | — | December 7, 2012 | Haleakala | Pan-STARRS 1 | · | 1.9 km | MPC · JPL |
| 593267 | 2015 KW_{68} | — | May 21, 2015 | Haleakala | Pan-STARRS 1 | · | 1.8 km | MPC · JPL |
| 593268 | 2015 KY_{75} | — | May 18, 2015 | Wildberg | R. Apitzsch | · | 2.0 km | MPC · JPL |
| 593269 | 2015 KE_{78} | — | May 31, 2011 | Mount Lemmon | Mount Lemmon Survey | BRA | 1.3 km | MPC · JPL |
| 593270 | 2015 KX_{80} | — | February 28, 2014 | Haleakala | Pan-STARRS 1 | · | 1.3 km | MPC · JPL |
| 593271 | 2015 KL_{84} | — | May 21, 2015 | Haleakala | Pan-STARRS 1 | · | 1.4 km | MPC · JPL |
| 593272 | 2015 KS_{84} | — | September 29, 2003 | Kitt Peak | Spacewatch | 526 | 2.0 km | MPC · JPL |
| 593273 | 2015 KG_{85} | — | October 15, 2012 | Mount Lemmon | Mount Lemmon Survey | · | 1.6 km | MPC · JPL |
| 593274 | 2015 KG_{87} | — | February 24, 2014 | Haleakala | Pan-STARRS 1 | · | 2.0 km | MPC · JPL |
| 593275 | 2015 KU_{88} | — | September 3, 2008 | Kitt Peak | Spacewatch | · | 1.3 km | MPC · JPL |
| 593276 | 2015 KK_{93} | — | October 20, 2012 | Mount Lemmon | Mount Lemmon Survey | · | 1.6 km | MPC · JPL |
| 593277 | 2015 KM_{99} | — | February 21, 2014 | Mount Lemmon | Mount Lemmon Survey | BRA | 1.2 km | MPC · JPL |
| 593278 | 2015 KM_{103} | — | February 20, 2014 | Mount Lemmon | Mount Lemmon Survey | · | 1.5 km | MPC · JPL |
| 593279 | 2015 KT_{106} | — | September 27, 2008 | Mount Lemmon | Mount Lemmon Survey | · | 1.4 km | MPC · JPL |
| 593280 | 2015 KY_{106} | — | December 6, 2012 | Mount Lemmon | Mount Lemmon Survey | · | 1.1 km | MPC · JPL |
| 593281 | 2015 KD_{111} | — | December 11, 2012 | Mount Lemmon | Mount Lemmon Survey | · | 2.2 km | MPC · JPL |
| 593282 | 2015 KA_{120} | — | April 18, 2015 | Haleakala | Pan-STARRS 1 | · | 1.8 km | MPC · JPL |
| 593283 | 2015 KE_{134} | — | November 21, 2008 | Mount Lemmon | Mount Lemmon Survey | · | 1.6 km | MPC · JPL |
| 593284 | 2015 KT_{134} | — | April 20, 2015 | Haleakala | Pan-STARRS 1 | · | 1.6 km | MPC · JPL |
| 593285 | 2015 KJ_{139} | — | May 18, 2015 | Haleakala | Pan-STARRS 2 | (5) | 1.0 km | MPC · JPL |
| 593286 | 2015 KZ_{140} | — | October 18, 2012 | Haleakala | Pan-STARRS 1 | · | 1.5 km | MPC · JPL |
| 593287 | 2015 KW_{144} | — | October 20, 2003 | Kitt Peak | Spacewatch | · | 1.9 km | MPC · JPL |
| 593288 | 2015 KT_{148} | — | December 12, 2012 | Kitt Peak | Spacewatch | · | 2.3 km | MPC · JPL |
| 593289 | 2015 KX_{149} | — | March 10, 2005 | Kitt Peak | Deep Ecliptic Survey | AGN | 1.0 km | MPC · JPL |
| 593290 | 2015 KU_{152} | — | May 25, 2015 | Haleakala | Pan-STARRS 1 | · | 1.8 km | MPC · JPL |
| 593291 | 2015 KH_{154} | — | May 25, 2015 | Haleakala | Pan-STARRS 1 | H | 500 m | MPC · JPL |
| 593292 | 2015 KA_{156} | — | August 24, 2005 | Palomar | NEAT | · | 3.6 km | MPC · JPL |
| 593293 | 2015 KQ_{160} | — | September 25, 2009 | Kitt Peak | Spacewatch | L4 | 7.2 km | MPC · JPL |
| 593294 | 2015 KY_{160} | — | November 4, 2012 | Mount Lemmon | Mount Lemmon Survey | AST | 1.6 km | MPC · JPL |
| 593295 | 2015 KK_{167} | — | February 9, 2008 | Mount Lemmon | Mount Lemmon Survey | · | 2.3 km | MPC · JPL |
| 593296 | 2015 KU_{167} | — | May 29, 2015 | Haleakala | Pan-STARRS 1 | · | 1.7 km | MPC · JPL |
| 593297 | 2015 KX_{186} | — | May 25, 2015 | Haleakala | Pan-STARRS 1 | KOR | 1.2 km | MPC · JPL |
| 593298 | 2015 KU_{187} | — | May 21, 2015 | Haleakala | Pan-STARRS 1 | EOS | 1.2 km | MPC · JPL |
| 593299 | 2015 KY_{203} | — | May 22, 2015 | Haleakala | Pan-STARRS 1 | · | 1.7 km | MPC · JPL |
| 593300 | 2015 LU_{1} | — | March 25, 2015 | Haleakala | Pan-STARRS 1 | HNS | 1.3 km | MPC · JPL |

== 593301–593400 ==
back to top

| Designation | | | Discovery | | | Properties | | Ref |
| Permanent | Provisional | Named after | Date | Site | Discoverer(s) | Category | Diam. | Ref |
|---|---|---|---|---|---|---|---|---|
| 593301 | 2015 LM_{2} | — | April 12, 2015 | Haleakala | Pan-STARRS 1 | L4 | 9.6 km | MPC · JPL |
| 593302 | 2015 LU_{3} | — | November 16, 2009 | Mount Lemmon | Mount Lemmon Survey | · | 1.8 km | MPC · JPL |
| 593303 | 2015 LY_{3} | — | July 2, 2011 | Kitt Peak | Spacewatch | · | 2.6 km | MPC · JPL |
| 593304 | 2015 LE_{4} | — | March 22, 2015 | Haleakala | Pan-STARRS 1 | · | 1.8 km | MPC · JPL |
| 593305 | 2015 LX_{4} | — | January 4, 2003 | Kitt Peak | Deep Lens Survey | · | 2.2 km | MPC · JPL |
| 593306 | 2015 LP_{6} | — | October 26, 2008 | Mount Lemmon | Mount Lemmon Survey | H | 580 m | MPC · JPL |
| 593307 | 2015 LQ_{6} | — | June 7, 2015 | Haleakala | Pan-STARRS 1 | H | 440 m | MPC · JPL |
| 593308 | 2015 LW_{10} | — | February 21, 2014 | Mayhill-ISON | L. Elenin | TIR | 2.6 km | MPC · JPL |
| 593309 | 2015 LG_{18} | — | December 4, 2012 | Mount Lemmon | Mount Lemmon Survey | · | 2.9 km | MPC · JPL |
| 593310 | 2015 LR_{20} | — | March 31, 2003 | Socorro | LINEAR | H | 730 m | MPC · JPL |
| 593311 | 2015 LW_{24} | — | March 15, 2012 | Mount Lemmon | Mount Lemmon Survey | H | 470 m | MPC · JPL |
| 593312 | 2015 LD_{35} | — | August 14, 2006 | Palomar | NEAT | · | 2.7 km | MPC · JPL |
| 593313 | 2015 LR_{37} | — | September 21, 2012 | Kitt Peak | Spacewatch | · | 2.2 km | MPC · JPL |
| 593314 | 2015 LY_{38} | — | October 10, 2008 | Mount Lemmon | Mount Lemmon Survey | · | 1.7 km | MPC · JPL |
| 593315 | 2015 LH_{40} | — | October 20, 1995 | Kitt Peak | Spacewatch | · | 1.3 km | MPC · JPL |
| 593316 | 2015 LX_{43} | — | June 10, 2015 | Haleakala | Pan-STARRS 1 | · | 1.6 km | MPC · JPL |
| 593317 | 2015 LR_{46} | — | August 7, 2016 | Haleakala | Pan-STARRS 1 | · | 1.3 km | MPC · JPL |
| 593318 | 2015 MG_{1} | — | November 17, 2011 | Kitt Peak | Spacewatch | · | 3.2 km | MPC · JPL |
| 593319 | 2015 MT_{3} | — | June 16, 2015 | Haleakala | Pan-STARRS 1 | H | 490 m | MPC · JPL |
| 593320 | 2015 MV_{14} | — | March 8, 2014 | Mount Lemmon | Mount Lemmon Survey | TIR | 2.0 km | MPC · JPL |
| 593321 | 2015 MH_{17} | — | October 28, 2008 | Mount Lemmon | Mount Lemmon Survey | · | 1.6 km | MPC · JPL |
| 593322 | 2015 MU_{18} | — | September 20, 2007 | Kitt Peak | Spacewatch | HOF | 2.1 km | MPC · JPL |
| 593323 | 2015 ME_{23} | — | November 24, 2008 | Kitt Peak | Spacewatch | · | 1.7 km | MPC · JPL |
| 593324 | 2015 ML_{57} | — | November 18, 2006 | Mount Lemmon | Mount Lemmon Survey | EOS | 2.5 km | MPC · JPL |
| 593325 | 2015 MP_{58} | — | June 13, 2015 | Haleakala | Pan-STARRS 1 | · | 2.0 km | MPC · JPL |
| 593326 | 2015 MY_{61} | — | January 17, 2007 | Mount Lemmon | Mount Lemmon Survey | · | 2.5 km | MPC · JPL |
| 593327 | 2015 MU_{68} | — | June 20, 2015 | Haleakala | Pan-STARRS 1 | · | 2.1 km | MPC · JPL |
| 593328 | 2015 MC_{70} | — | June 22, 2015 | Haleakala | Pan-STARRS 1 | · | 1.5 km | MPC · JPL |
| 593329 | 2015 MF_{74} | — | March 10, 2014 | Mount Lemmon | Mount Lemmon Survey | · | 2.0 km | MPC · JPL |
| 593330 | 2015 MD_{76} | — | February 2, 2008 | Kitt Peak | Spacewatch | EOS | 1.5 km | MPC · JPL |
| 593331 | 2015 MF_{78} | — | August 24, 2005 | Palomar | NEAT | · | 1.5 km | MPC · JPL |
| 593332 | 2015 ME_{81} | — | June 18, 2015 | Haleakala | Pan-STARRS 1 | · | 2.0 km | MPC · JPL |
| 593333 | 2015 MW_{82} | — | June 22, 2015 | Haleakala | Pan-STARRS 1 | · | 1.9 km | MPC · JPL |
| 593334 | 2015 MB_{83} | — | February 7, 2002 | Palomar | NEAT | · | 2.2 km | MPC · JPL |
| 593335 | 2015 MS_{83} | — | April 28, 2009 | Kitt Peak | Spacewatch | · | 1.8 km | MPC · JPL |
| 593336 | 2015 MD_{86} | — | June 18, 2015 | Haleakala | Pan-STARRS 1 | · | 1.8 km | MPC · JPL |
| 593337 | 2015 MY_{87} | — | January 17, 2013 | Mount Lemmon | Mount Lemmon Survey | · | 1.9 km | MPC · JPL |
| 593338 | 2015 MN_{88} | — | February 9, 2013 | Haleakala | Pan-STARRS 1 | · | 2.2 km | MPC · JPL |
| 593339 | 2015 MG_{91} | — | November 6, 2010 | Kitt Peak | Spacewatch | · | 3.2 km | MPC · JPL |
| 593340 | 2015 MH_{91} | — | December 31, 2011 | Mount Lemmon | Mount Lemmon Survey | URS | 2.9 km | MPC · JPL |
| 593341 | 2015 MX_{95} | — | April 18, 2009 | Kitt Peak | Spacewatch | · | 1.9 km | MPC · JPL |
| 593342 | 2015 MF_{96} | — | August 30, 2005 | Kitt Peak | Spacewatch | EOS | 1.8 km | MPC · JPL |
| 593343 | 2015 MF_{102} | — | September 18, 2010 | Mount Lemmon | Mount Lemmon Survey | TIR | 1.9 km | MPC · JPL |
| 593344 | 2015 MC_{103} | — | June 15, 2015 | Haleakala | Pan-STARRS 1 | · | 2.1 km | MPC · JPL |
| 593345 | 2015 MG_{103} | — | January 22, 2002 | Kitt Peak | Spacewatch | · | 2.6 km | MPC · JPL |
| 593346 | 2015 MU_{115} | — | May 5, 2003 | Kitt Peak | Spacewatch | · | 2.4 km | MPC · JPL |
| 593347 | 2015 MY_{124} | — | September 18, 2010 | Mount Lemmon | Mount Lemmon Survey | · | 2.8 km | MPC · JPL |
| 593348 | 2015 MA_{125} | — | July 11, 2004 | Anderson Mesa | LONEOS | · | 3.3 km | MPC · JPL |
| 593349 | 2015 MX_{129} | — | January 15, 2007 | Bergisch Gladbach | W. Bickel | · | 3.5 km | MPC · JPL |
| 593350 | 2015 MB_{137} | — | February 21, 2007 | Charleston | R. Holmes | · | 2.7 km | MPC · JPL |
| 593351 | 2015 ME_{137} | — | June 26, 2015 | Haleakala | Pan-STARRS 1 | · | 1.9 km | MPC · JPL |
| 593352 | 2015 MV_{139} | — | April 20, 2014 | Mount Lemmon | Mount Lemmon Survey | EOS | 1.3 km | MPC · JPL |
| 593353 | 2015 MK_{140} | — | September 14, 2005 | Kitt Peak | Spacewatch | EOS | 1.6 km | MPC · JPL |
| 593354 | 2015 MG_{144} | — | April 29, 2014 | Haleakala | Pan-STARRS 1 | · | 2.4 km | MPC · JPL |
| 593355 | 2015 MY_{146} | — | August 16, 2009 | Kitt Peak | Spacewatch | · | 2.0 km | MPC · JPL |
| 593356 | 2015 MF_{147} | — | June 26, 2015 | Haleakala | Pan-STARRS 1 | · | 2.7 km | MPC · JPL |
| 593357 | 2015 MD_{149} | — | June 27, 2015 | Haleakala | Pan-STARRS 1 | EOS | 1.7 km | MPC · JPL |
| 593358 | 2015 MF_{159} | — | June 24, 2015 | Haleakala | Pan-STARRS 1 | · | 3.2 km | MPC · JPL |
| 593359 | 2015 MM_{166} | — | June 17, 2015 | Haleakala | Pan-STARRS 1 | · | 1.9 km | MPC · JPL |
| 593360 | 2015 MO_{166} | — | June 20, 2015 | Haleakala | Pan-STARRS 1 | · | 2.1 km | MPC · JPL |
| 593361 | 2015 MZ_{166} | — | June 23, 2015 | Haleakala | Pan-STARRS 1 | · | 1.6 km | MPC · JPL |
| 593362 | 2015 MU_{167} | — | June 17, 2015 | Haleakala | Pan-STARRS 1 | · | 2.0 km | MPC · JPL |
| 593363 | 2015 MB_{183} | — | June 18, 2015 | Haleakala | Pan-STARRS 1 | · | 3.4 km | MPC · JPL |
| 593364 | 2015 NQ_{4} | — | January 10, 2013 | Haleakala | Pan-STARRS 1 | · | 2.9 km | MPC · JPL |
| 593365 | 2015 NN_{14} | — | February 15, 2013 | Haleakala | Pan-STARRS 1 | · | 2.7 km | MPC · JPL |
| 593366 | 2015 NG_{25} | — | June 19, 2004 | Catalina | CSS | · | 4.1 km | MPC · JPL |
| 593367 | 2015 NA_{29} | — | August 1, 2016 | Haleakala | Pan-STARRS 1 | · | 1.6 km | MPC · JPL |
| 593368 | 2015 NO_{31} | — | July 12, 2015 | Haleakala | Pan-STARRS 1 | · | 1.9 km | MPC · JPL |
| 593369 | 2015 OB_{1} | — | March 2, 2008 | Kitt Peak | Spacewatch | · | 3.2 km | MPC · JPL |
| 593370 | 2015 OZ_{3} | — | June 15, 2015 | Mount Lemmon | Mount Lemmon Survey | EOS | 1.8 km | MPC · JPL |
| 593371 | 2015 OU_{5} | — | September 29, 2005 | Mount Lemmon | Mount Lemmon Survey | EOS | 1.9 km | MPC · JPL |
| 593372 | 2015 OY_{5} | — | February 28, 2014 | Haleakala | Pan-STARRS 1 | TIR | 2.3 km | MPC · JPL |
| 593373 | 2015 OV_{6} | — | March 8, 2008 | Mount Lemmon | Mount Lemmon Survey | · | 1.9 km | MPC · JPL |
| 593374 | 2015 OD_{7} | — | April 9, 2014 | Mount Lemmon | Mount Lemmon Survey | · | 2.2 km | MPC · JPL |
| 593375 | 2015 OA_{8} | — | October 24, 2011 | Mount Lemmon | Mount Lemmon Survey | · | 1.8 km | MPC · JPL |
| 593376 | 2015 OZ_{13} | — | February 27, 2014 | Haleakala | Pan-STARRS 1 | · | 2.2 km | MPC · JPL |
| 593377 | 2015 OR_{16} | — | April 24, 2014 | Haleakala | Pan-STARRS 1 | EOS | 1.9 km | MPC · JPL |
| 593378 | 2015 OQ_{23} | — | April 4, 2014 | Haleakala | Pan-STARRS 1 | · | 2.3 km | MPC · JPL |
| 593379 | 2015 OV_{23} | — | June 20, 2015 | Haleakala | Pan-STARRS 2 | · | 2.8 km | MPC · JPL |
| 593380 | 2015 OY_{25} | — | January 25, 2007 | Kitt Peak | Spacewatch | · | 2.9 km | MPC · JPL |
| 593381 | 2015 OP_{27} | — | February 6, 2013 | Kitt Peak | Spacewatch | EOS | 1.8 km | MPC · JPL |
| 593382 | 2015 OC_{32} | — | December 13, 2006 | Mount Lemmon | Mount Lemmon Survey | EOS | 2.0 km | MPC · JPL |
| 593383 | 2015 OL_{33} | — | December 1, 2011 | Haleakala | Pan-STARRS 1 | EOS | 2.1 km | MPC · JPL |
| 593384 | 2015 OL_{34} | — | October 2, 2010 | Kitt Peak | Spacewatch | · | 1.9 km | MPC · JPL |
| 593385 | 2015 OZ_{34} | — | October 27, 2005 | Mount Lemmon | Mount Lemmon Survey | · | 2.0 km | MPC · JPL |
| 593386 | 2015 OF_{37} | — | February 15, 2013 | Haleakala | Pan-STARRS 1 | · | 2.8 km | MPC · JPL |
| 593387 | 2015 OR_{39} | — | February 13, 2002 | Apache Point | SDSS Collaboration | EOS | 2.2 km | MPC · JPL |
| 593388 | 2015 OB_{46} | — | March 29, 2014 | Kitt Peak | Spacewatch | VER | 2.4 km | MPC · JPL |
| 593389 | 2015 OV_{48} | — | October 24, 2011 | Haleakala | Pan-STARRS 1 | EOS | 1.6 km | MPC · JPL |
| 593390 | 2015 OK_{50} | — | July 26, 2015 | Haleakala | Pan-STARRS 1 | · | 2.2 km | MPC · JPL |
| 593391 | 2015 OZ_{56} | — | December 7, 2005 | Kitt Peak | Spacewatch | TIR | 2.8 km | MPC · JPL |
| 593392 | 2015 OT_{60} | — | September 11, 2004 | Kitt Peak | Spacewatch | · | 2.6 km | MPC · JPL |
| 593393 | 2015 OX_{79} | — | July 18, 2015 | Haleakala | Pan-STARRS 1 | H | 430 m | MPC · JPL |
| 593394 | 2015 OD_{90} | — | November 20, 2006 | Mount Lemmon | Mount Lemmon Survey | EOS | 1.9 km | MPC · JPL |
| 593395 | 2015 OU_{90} | — | July 23, 2015 | Haleakala | Pan-STARRS 1 | EOS | 2.1 km | MPC · JPL |
| 593396 | 2015 OF_{91} | — | July 28, 2015 | Haleakala | Pan-STARRS 1 | EOS | 1.4 km | MPC · JPL |
| 593397 | 2015 OE_{92} | — | July 19, 2015 | Haleakala | Pan-STARRS 2 | EOS | 1.6 km | MPC · JPL |
| 593398 | 2015 OJ_{92} | — | July 19, 2015 | Haleakala | Pan-STARRS 1 | · | 2.2 km | MPC · JPL |
| 593399 | 2015 OL_{93} | — | November 6, 2010 | Mount Lemmon | Mount Lemmon Survey | · | 2.5 km | MPC · JPL |
| 593400 | 2015 OM_{93} | — | November 2, 2010 | Mount Lemmon | Mount Lemmon Survey | · | 2.6 km | MPC · JPL |

== 593401–593500 ==
back to top

| Designation | | | Discovery | | | Properties | | Ref |
| Permanent | Provisional | Named after | Date | Site | Discoverer(s) | Category | Diam. | Ref |
|---|---|---|---|---|---|---|---|---|
| 593401 | 2015 OT_{93} | — | July 23, 2015 | Haleakala | Pan-STARRS 1 | EOS | 1.2 km | MPC · JPL |
| 593402 | 2015 OP_{95} | — | December 31, 2011 | Kitt Peak | Spacewatch | · | 2.6 km | MPC · JPL |
| 593403 | 2015 OS_{95} | — | November 16, 2010 | Mount Lemmon | Mount Lemmon Survey | VER | 2.2 km | MPC · JPL |
| 593404 | 2015 OB_{98} | — | July 24, 2015 | Haleakala | Pan-STARRS 1 | · | 2.5 km | MPC · JPL |
| 593405 | 2015 OV_{99} | — | September 6, 2004 | Altschwendt | W. Ries | · | 3.2 km | MPC · JPL |
| 593406 | 2015 ON_{100} | — | October 30, 2010 | Piszkés-tető | K. Sárneczky, Z. Kuli | · | 2.5 km | MPC · JPL |
| 593407 | 2015 OL_{102} | — | July 25, 2015 | Haleakala | Pan-STARRS 1 | · | 2.8 km | MPC · JPL |
| 593408 | 2015 OZ_{102} | — | July 25, 2015 | Haleakala | Pan-STARRS 1 | · | 3.2 km | MPC · JPL |
| 593409 | 2015 OT_{105} | — | July 19, 2015 | Haleakala | Pan-STARRS 1 | · | 2.2 km | MPC · JPL |
| 593410 | 2015 OU_{105} | — | July 25, 2015 | Haleakala | Pan-STARRS 1 | · | 2.7 km | MPC · JPL |
| 593411 | 2015 OF_{118} | — | July 19, 2015 | Haleakala | Pan-STARRS 1 | · | 2.6 km | MPC · JPL |
| 593412 | 2015 OO_{122} | — | July 28, 2015 | Haleakala | Pan-STARRS 2 | EUP | 3.0 km | MPC · JPL |
| 593413 | 2015 OX_{122} | — | July 23, 2015 | Haleakala | Pan-STARRS 1 | · | 2.3 km | MPC · JPL |
| 593414 | 2015 OH_{124} | — | July 25, 2015 | Haleakala | Pan-STARRS 1 | VER | 1.8 km | MPC · JPL |
| 593415 | 2015 OO_{137} | — | July 23, 2015 | Haleakala | Pan-STARRS 1 | EOS | 1.5 km | MPC · JPL |
| 593416 | 2015 OL_{142} | — | July 19, 2015 | Haleakala | Pan-STARRS 1 | · | 2.5 km | MPC · JPL |
| 593417 | 2015 OU_{150} | — | July 23, 2015 | Haleakala | Pan-STARRS 1 | · | 2.4 km | MPC · JPL |
| 593418 | 2015 PM_{7} | — | June 2, 2014 | Haleakala | Pan-STARRS 1 | · | 3.2 km | MPC · JPL |
| 593419 | 2015 PP_{12} | — | July 23, 2015 | Haleakala | Pan-STARRS 1 | · | 2.3 km | MPC · JPL |
| 593420 | 2015 PK_{19} | — | January 14, 2008 | Kitt Peak | Spacewatch | · | 2.0 km | MPC · JPL |
| 593421 | 2015 PN_{20} | — | February 16, 2013 | Kitt Peak | Spacewatch | · | 1.7 km | MPC · JPL |
| 593422 | 2015 PJ_{25} | — | January 4, 2014 | Haleakala | Pan-STARRS 1 | H | 400 m | MPC · JPL |
| 593423 | 2015 PK_{25} | — | April 30, 2014 | Haleakala | Pan-STARRS 1 | · | 2.0 km | MPC · JPL |
| 593424 | 2015 PU_{27} | — | May 1, 2009 | Kitt Peak | Spacewatch | EOS | 1.8 km | MPC · JPL |
| 593425 | 2015 PK_{28} | — | September 14, 2005 | Kitt Peak | Spacewatch | · | 2.1 km | MPC · JPL |
| 593426 | 2015 PL_{28} | — | August 8, 2015 | Haleakala | Pan-STARRS 1 | EOS | 1.5 km | MPC · JPL |
| 593427 | 2015 PK_{30} | — | May 25, 2014 | Haleakala | Pan-STARRS 1 | · | 2.6 km | MPC · JPL |
| 593428 | 2015 PO_{31} | — | February 14, 2012 | Haleakala | Pan-STARRS 1 | · | 2.4 km | MPC · JPL |
| 593429 | 2015 PO_{33} | — | August 8, 2015 | Haleakala | Pan-STARRS 1 | · | 1.7 km | MPC · JPL |
| 593430 | 2015 PB_{38} | — | July 24, 2015 | Haleakala | Pan-STARRS 1 | · | 2.0 km | MPC · JPL |
| 593431 | 2015 PV_{38} | — | September 4, 2010 | Mount Lemmon | Mount Lemmon Survey | EOS | 1.5 km | MPC · JPL |
| 593432 | 2015 PG_{42} | — | December 31, 2011 | Kitt Peak | Spacewatch | · | 2.8 km | MPC · JPL |
| 593433 | 2015 PO_{45} | — | August 9, 2015 | Haleakala | Pan-STARRS 1 | EOS | 1.6 km | MPC · JPL |
| 593434 | 2015 PX_{45} | — | January 19, 2012 | Kitt Peak | Spacewatch | · | 3.3 km | MPC · JPL |
| 593435 | 2015 PQ_{46} | — | July 24, 2015 | Haleakala | Pan-STARRS 1 | VER | 2.4 km | MPC · JPL |
| 593436 | 2015 PV_{47} | — | July 12, 2015 | Haleakala | Pan-STARRS 1 | · | 2.9 km | MPC · JPL |
| 593437 | 2015 PH_{51} | — | August 9, 2015 | Haleakala | Pan-STARRS 1 | EOS | 1.7 km | MPC · JPL |
| 593438 | 2015 PB_{54} | — | October 14, 2010 | Mount Lemmon | Mount Lemmon Survey | URS | 3.1 km | MPC · JPL |
| 593439 | 2015 PG_{54} | — | September 21, 2004 | Anderson Mesa | LONEOS | · | 2.8 km | MPC · JPL |
| 593440 | 2015 PL_{58} | — | October 8, 2010 | Catalina | CSS | · | 2.9 km | MPC · JPL |
| 593441 | 2015 PZ_{59} | — | April 26, 2003 | Kitt Peak | Spacewatch | · | 2.4 km | MPC · JPL |
| 593442 | 2015 PB_{66} | — | June 21, 2015 | Haleakala | Pan-STARRS 1 | · | 2.2 km | MPC · JPL |
| 593443 | 2015 PG_{66} | — | May 16, 2009 | Kitt Peak | Spacewatch | · | 2.2 km | MPC · JPL |
| 593444 | 2015 PK_{68} | — | September 18, 2010 | Mount Lemmon | Mount Lemmon Survey | · | 3.2 km | MPC · JPL |
| 593445 | 2015 PE_{69} | — | December 23, 2012 | Haleakala | Pan-STARRS 1 | · | 2.2 km | MPC · JPL |
| 593446 | 2015 PC_{70} | — | November 9, 2007 | Kitt Peak | Spacewatch | PAD | 1.4 km | MPC · JPL |
| 593447 | 2015 PK_{74} | — | June 26, 2015 | Haleakala | Pan-STARRS 1 | · | 2.5 km | MPC · JPL |
| 593448 | 2015 PP_{74} | — | April 1, 2003 | Kitt Peak | Deep Ecliptic Survey | THM | 1.4 km | MPC · JPL |
| 593449 | 2015 PH_{75} | — | June 26, 2015 | Haleakala | Pan-STARRS 1 | · | 2.1 km | MPC · JPL |
| 593450 | 2015 PP_{79} | — | December 1, 2011 | Haleakala | Pan-STARRS 1 | · | 2.0 km | MPC · JPL |
| 593451 | 2015 PR_{79} | — | December 30, 2007 | Mount Lemmon | Mount Lemmon Survey | · | 2.5 km | MPC · JPL |
| 593452 | 2015 PB_{83} | — | June 18, 2015 | Haleakala | Pan-STARRS 1 | · | 2.0 km | MPC · JPL |
| 593453 | 2015 PX_{85} | — | June 18, 2015 | Haleakala | Pan-STARRS 1 | LIX | 2.2 km | MPC · JPL |
| 593454 | 2015 PM_{86} | — | June 26, 2015 | Haleakala | Pan-STARRS 1 | · | 1.9 km | MPC · JPL |
| 593455 | 2015 PZ_{87} | — | December 17, 2012 | ESA OGS | ESA OGS | · | 2.5 km | MPC · JPL |
| 593456 | 2015 PZ_{88} | — | July 19, 2015 | Haleakala | Pan-STARRS 1 | · | 1.8 km | MPC · JPL |
| 593457 | 2015 PO_{112} | — | January 19, 2013 | Mount Lemmon | Mount Lemmon Survey | EOS | 1.4 km | MPC · JPL |
| 593458 | 2015 PX_{113} | — | August 31, 2005 | Kitt Peak | Spacewatch | · | 1.9 km | MPC · JPL |
| 593459 | 2015 PE_{114} | — | April 25, 2003 | Kitt Peak | Spacewatch | NYS | 1.0 km | MPC · JPL |
| 593460 | 2015 PY_{116} | — | March 12, 2013 | Mount Lemmon | Mount Lemmon Survey | EOS | 1.7 km | MPC · JPL |
| 593461 | 2015 PY_{120} | — | January 18, 2013 | Kitt Peak | Spacewatch | · | 2.3 km | MPC · JPL |
| 593462 | 2015 PU_{121} | — | January 17, 2007 | Kitt Peak | Spacewatch | · | 2.5 km | MPC · JPL |
| 593463 | 2015 PD_{124} | — | October 9, 2010 | Mount Lemmon | Mount Lemmon Survey | THM | 2.1 km | MPC · JPL |
| 593464 | 2015 PY_{124} | — | September 5, 2010 | Taunus | Karge, S., R. Kling | EOS | 2.0 km | MPC · JPL |
| 593465 | 2015 PZ_{126} | — | May 10, 2014 | Haleakala | Pan-STARRS 1 | · | 1.9 km | MPC · JPL |
| 593466 | 2015 PK_{128} | — | August 6, 2005 | Palomar | NEAT | EOS | 2.2 km | MPC · JPL |
| 593467 | 2015 PN_{129} | — | July 25, 2015 | Haleakala | Pan-STARRS 1 | · | 2.2 km | MPC · JPL |
| 593468 | 2015 PS_{129} | — | January 17, 2013 | Mount Lemmon | Mount Lemmon Survey | EOS | 1.4 km | MPC · JPL |
| 593469 | 2015 PA_{133} | — | February 10, 2008 | Kitt Peak | Spacewatch | · | 1.5 km | MPC · JPL |
| 593470 | 2015 PO_{138} | — | September 3, 2010 | Mount Lemmon | Mount Lemmon Survey | · | 1.9 km | MPC · JPL |
| 593471 | 2015 PS_{138} | — | July 25, 2015 | Haleakala | Pan-STARRS 1 | · | 1.7 km | MPC · JPL |
| 593472 | 2015 PV_{138} | — | May 11, 2014 | Mount Lemmon | Mount Lemmon Survey | · | 2.7 km | MPC · JPL |
| 593473 | 2015 PO_{141} | — | September 2, 2010 | Mount Lemmon | Mount Lemmon Survey | · | 2.5 km | MPC · JPL |
| 593474 | 2015 PQ_{142} | — | April 30, 2014 | Haleakala | Pan-STARRS 1 | EOS | 1.7 km | MPC · JPL |
| 593475 | 2015 PO_{144} | — | March 23, 2003 | Apache Point | SDSS Collaboration | EOS | 1.7 km | MPC · JPL |
| 593476 | 2015 PV_{145} | — | April 5, 2003 | Kitt Peak | Spacewatch | · | 2.7 km | MPC · JPL |
| 593477 | 2015 PZ_{146} | — | August 10, 2015 | Haleakala | Pan-STARRS 1 | · | 2.9 km | MPC · JPL |
| 593478 | 2015 PU_{152} | — | August 10, 2015 | Haleakala | Pan-STARRS 1 | · | 1.9 km | MPC · JPL |
| 593479 | 2015 PY_{153} | — | April 4, 2014 | Mount Lemmon | Mount Lemmon Survey | · | 2.1 km | MPC · JPL |
| 593480 | 2015 PH_{162} | — | February 14, 2013 | Haleakala | Pan-STARRS 1 | · | 2.0 km | MPC · JPL |
| 593481 | 2015 PP_{174} | — | June 17, 2015 | Haleakala | Pan-STARRS 1 | · | 2.0 km | MPC · JPL |
| 593482 | 2015 PT_{191} | — | June 11, 2004 | Kitt Peak | Spacewatch | EOS | 2.3 km | MPC · JPL |
| 593483 | 2015 PK_{192} | — | April 3, 2008 | Mount Lemmon | Mount Lemmon Survey | · | 2.4 km | MPC · JPL |
| 593484 | 2015 PF_{193} | — | October 12, 1999 | Kitt Peak | Spacewatch | VER | 2.6 km | MPC · JPL |
| 593485 | 2015 PN_{194} | — | October 23, 2011 | Haleakala | Pan-STARRS 1 | · | 1.9 km | MPC · JPL |
| 593486 | 2015 PT_{194} | — | December 2, 2005 | Kitt Peak | Spacewatch | · | 2.8 km | MPC · JPL |
| 593487 | 2015 PD_{195} | — | July 24, 2015 | Haleakala | Pan-STARRS 1 | · | 2.4 km | MPC · JPL |
| 593488 | 2015 PJ_{204} | — | July 24, 2015 | Haleakala | Pan-STARRS 1 | · | 2.3 km | MPC · JPL |
| 593489 | 2015 PW_{215} | — | May 14, 2008 | Mount Lemmon | Mount Lemmon Survey | URS | 4.1 km | MPC · JPL |
| 593490 | 2015 PD_{217} | — | May 8, 2008 | Mount Lemmon | Mount Lemmon Survey | · | 3.5 km | MPC · JPL |
| 593491 | 2015 PR_{219} | — | October 11, 2010 | Mount Lemmon | Mount Lemmon Survey | · | 2.1 km | MPC · JPL |
| 593492 | 2015 PJ_{220} | — | September 10, 2010 | Mount Lemmon | Mount Lemmon Survey | URS | 2.5 km | MPC · JPL |
| 593493 | 2015 PA_{222} | — | April 12, 2013 | Haleakala | Pan-STARRS 1 | · | 2.8 km | MPC · JPL |
| 593494 | 2015 PP_{222} | — | June 4, 2014 | Haleakala | Pan-STARRS 1 | · | 1.9 km | MPC · JPL |
| 593495 | 2015 PX_{222} | — | May 10, 2014 | Mount Lemmon | Mount Lemmon Survey | LUT | 3.6 km | MPC · JPL |
| 593496 | 2015 PB_{231} | — | July 9, 2010 | WISE | WISE | · | 2.6 km | MPC · JPL |
| 593497 | 2015 PJ_{233} | — | February 28, 2014 | Haleakala | Pan-STARRS 1 | THM | 1.9 km | MPC · JPL |
| 593498 | 2015 PP_{235} | — | April 5, 2014 | Haleakala | Pan-STARRS 1 | · | 2.1 km | MPC · JPL |
| 593499 | 2015 PZ_{235} | — | March 23, 2014 | Kitt Peak | Spacewatch | · | 1.5 km | MPC · JPL |
| 593500 | 2015 PB_{237} | — | October 24, 2011 | Haleakala | Pan-STARRS 1 | · | 1.3 km | MPC · JPL |

== 593501–593600 ==
back to top

| Designation | | | Discovery | | | Properties | | Ref |
| Permanent | Provisional | Named after | Date | Site | Discoverer(s) | Category | Diam. | Ref |
|---|---|---|---|---|---|---|---|---|
| 593501 | 2015 PN_{247} | — | July 19, 2015 | Haleakala | Pan-STARRS 2 | · | 2.5 km | MPC · JPL |
| 593502 | 2015 PO_{249} | — | October 1, 2010 | Kitt Peak | Spacewatch | EOS | 1.4 km | MPC · JPL |
| 593503 | 2015 PD_{250} | — | March 29, 2008 | Kitt Peak | Spacewatch | · | 2.8 km | MPC · JPL |
| 593504 | 2015 PY_{250} | — | May 7, 2014 | Haleakala | Pan-STARRS 1 | · | 1.6 km | MPC · JPL |
| 593505 | 2015 PQ_{251} | — | March 20, 1998 | Kitt Peak | Spacewatch | · | 1.9 km | MPC · JPL |
| 593506 | 2015 PR_{251} | — | March 9, 2002 | Kitt Peak | Spacewatch | · | 2.3 km | MPC · JPL |
| 593507 | 2015 PB_{258} | — | December 15, 2006 | Kitt Peak | Spacewatch | · | 3.1 km | MPC · JPL |
| 593508 | 2015 PE_{259} | — | May 23, 2014 | Haleakala | Pan-STARRS 1 | · | 1.6 km | MPC · JPL |
| 593509 | 2015 PK_{260} | — | August 11, 2015 | Haleakala | Pan-STARRS 1 | · | 2.4 km | MPC · JPL |
| 593510 | 2015 PZ_{260} | — | February 15, 2013 | Haleakala | Pan-STARRS 1 | EOS | 2.0 km | MPC · JPL |
| 593511 | 2015 PN_{264} | — | February 28, 2008 | Mount Lemmon | Mount Lemmon Survey | · | 2.0 km | MPC · JPL |
| 593512 | 2015 PR_{266} | — | February 8, 2007 | Mount Lemmon | Mount Lemmon Survey | · | 2.6 km | MPC · JPL |
| 593513 | 2015 PS_{268} | — | September 17, 2010 | Mount Lemmon | Mount Lemmon Survey | · | 2.1 km | MPC · JPL |
| 593514 | 2015 PY_{268} | — | August 31, 2005 | Kitt Peak | Spacewatch | · | 2.0 km | MPC · JPL |
| 593515 | 2015 PB_{275} | — | October 30, 2010 | Mount Lemmon | Mount Lemmon Survey | · | 2.6 km | MPC · JPL |
| 593516 | 2015 PX_{275} | — | October 6, 2005 | Mount Lemmon | Mount Lemmon Survey | EOS | 1.6 km | MPC · JPL |
| 593517 | 2015 PL_{276} | — | December 27, 2011 | Kitt Peak | Spacewatch | EOS | 1.7 km | MPC · JPL |
| 593518 | 2015 PA_{282} | — | April 1, 2003 | Apache Point | SDSS Collaboration | EOS | 1.7 km | MPC · JPL |
| 593519 | 2015 PU_{286} | — | October 28, 2010 | Mount Lemmon | Mount Lemmon Survey | VER | 2.4 km | MPC · JPL |
| 593520 | 2015 PZ_{286} | — | November 30, 2011 | Mount Lemmon | Mount Lemmon Survey | · | 1.9 km | MPC · JPL |
| 593521 | 2015 PL_{287} | — | September 23, 2011 | Mount Lemmon | Mount Lemmon Survey | · | 1.9 km | MPC · JPL |
| 593522 | 2015 PN_{288} | — | May 7, 2014 | Haleakala | Pan-STARRS 1 | EOS | 1.5 km | MPC · JPL |
| 593523 | 2015 PW_{288} | — | November 21, 2006 | Mount Lemmon | Mount Lemmon Survey | EOS | 2.0 km | MPC · JPL |
| 593524 | 2015 PN_{289} | — | July 24, 2015 | Haleakala | Pan-STARRS 1 | · | 3.4 km | MPC · JPL |
| 593525 | 2015 PU_{289} | — | July 24, 2015 | Haleakala | Pan-STARRS 1 | · | 3.0 km | MPC · JPL |
| 593526 | 2015 PU_{294} | — | July 24, 2015 | Haleakala | Pan-STARRS 1 | · | 2.1 km | MPC · JPL |
| 593527 | 2015 PT_{295} | — | October 2, 2005 | Mount Lemmon | Mount Lemmon Survey | EOS | 1.8 km | MPC · JPL |
| 593528 | 2015 PA_{298} | — | August 13, 2015 | Haleakala | Pan-STARRS 1 | · | 3.1 km | MPC · JPL |
| 593529 | 2015 PM_{303} | — | May 7, 2014 | Haleakala | Pan-STARRS 1 | · | 2.7 km | MPC · JPL |
| 593530 | 2015 PM_{306} | — | March 18, 2013 | Mount Lemmon | Mount Lemmon Survey | · | 2.8 km | MPC · JPL |
| 593531 | 2015 PO_{308} | — | July 10, 2004 | Palomar | NEAT | · | 2.8 km | MPC · JPL |
| 593532 | 2015 PU_{311} | — | July 23, 2015 | Haleakala | Pan-STARRS 1 | EOS | 1.7 km | MPC · JPL |
| 593533 | 2015 PX_{313} | — | August 13, 2015 | Haleakala | Pan-STARRS 1 | EOS | 1.8 km | MPC · JPL |
| 593534 | 2015 PB_{322} | — | October 13, 2010 | Mount Lemmon | Mount Lemmon Survey | VER | 2.0 km | MPC · JPL |
| 593535 | 2015 PA_{334} | — | August 12, 2015 | Haleakala | Pan-STARRS 1 | · | 2.8 km | MPC · JPL |
| 593536 | 2015 PA_{346} | — | August 10, 2015 | Haleakala | Pan-STARRS 2 | · | 1.9 km | MPC · JPL |
| 593537 | 2015 QO_{2} | — | July 9, 2005 | Kitt Peak | Spacewatch | · | 2.1 km | MPC · JPL |
| 593538 | 2015 QA_{4} | — | October 11, 2010 | Mount Lemmon | Mount Lemmon Survey | · | 3.1 km | MPC · JPL |
| 593539 | 2015 QH_{4} | — | July 12, 2015 | Haleakala | Pan-STARRS 1 | · | 2.8 km | MPC · JPL |
| 593540 | 2015 QQ_{4} | — | February 10, 2007 | Mount Lemmon | Mount Lemmon Survey | EOS | 1.8 km | MPC · JPL |
| 593541 | 2015 QD_{5} | — | October 31, 2010 | Mount Lemmon | Mount Lemmon Survey | VER | 2.4 km | MPC · JPL |
| 593542 | 2015 QP_{5} | — | September 10, 2010 | Kitt Peak | Spacewatch | · | 2.3 km | MPC · JPL |
| 593543 | 2015 QZ_{7} | — | February 25, 2007 | Kitt Peak | Spacewatch | · | 2.6 km | MPC · JPL |
| 593544 | 2015 QQ_{11} | — | September 29, 2011 | Mount Lemmon | Mount Lemmon Survey | · | 5.4 km | MPC · JPL |
| 593545 | 2015 QR_{11} | — | August 1, 2009 | Kitt Peak | Spacewatch | URS | 3.8 km | MPC · JPL |
| 593546 | 2015 QQ_{15} | — | August 20, 2015 | Kitt Peak | Spacewatch | EOS | 1.4 km | MPC · JPL |
| 593547 | 2015 QC_{17} | — | August 21, 2015 | Haleakala | Pan-STARRS 1 | EOS | 1.5 km | MPC · JPL |
| 593548 | 2015 QJ_{19} | — | August 21, 2015 | Haleakala | Pan-STARRS 1 | LIX | 3.0 km | MPC · JPL |
| 593549 | 2015 QJ_{27} | — | August 21, 2015 | Haleakala | Pan-STARRS 1 | · | 2.7 km | MPC · JPL |
| 593550 | 2015 RS_{4} | — | June 15, 2015 | Mount Lemmon | Mount Lemmon Survey | · | 2.3 km | MPC · JPL |
| 593551 | 2015 RA_{7} | — | April 30, 2014 | Haleakala | Pan-STARRS 1 | EOS | 1.6 km | MPC · JPL |
| 593552 | 2015 RA_{11} | — | February 6, 2007 | Mount Lemmon | Mount Lemmon Survey | · | 2.7 km | MPC · JPL |
| 593553 | 2015 RS_{13} | — | September 29, 2005 | Kitt Peak | Spacewatch | · | 1.3 km | MPC · JPL |
| 593554 | 2015 RG_{15} | — | July 14, 2015 | Haleakala | Pan-STARRS 1 | · | 2.8 km | MPC · JPL |
| 593555 | 2015 RY_{15} | — | May 9, 2014 | Haleakala | Pan-STARRS 1 | · | 2.6 km | MPC · JPL |
| 593556 | 2015 RG_{16} | — | September 29, 2010 | Mount Lemmon | Mount Lemmon Survey | · | 2.4 km | MPC · JPL |
| 593557 | 2015 RT_{16} | — | September 3, 2010 | Mount Lemmon | Mount Lemmon Survey | · | 3.2 km | MPC · JPL |
| 593558 | 2015 RG_{17} | — | July 23, 2015 | Haleakala | Pan-STARRS 1 | · | 2.7 km | MPC · JPL |
| 593559 | 2015 RH_{17} | — | August 17, 2009 | Catalina | CSS | · | 3.3 km | MPC · JPL |
| 593560 | 2015 RF_{20} | — | July 25, 2015 | Haleakala | Pan-STARRS 1 | · | 3.6 km | MPC · JPL |
| 593561 | 2015 RJ_{20} | — | April 5, 2014 | Haleakala | Pan-STARRS 1 | · | 2.3 km | MPC · JPL |
| 593562 | 2015 RC_{23} | — | September 6, 2015 | Kitt Peak | Spacewatch | VER | 2.3 km | MPC · JPL |
| 593563 | 2015 RU_{26} | — | November 2, 2005 | Mount Lemmon | Mount Lemmon Survey | · | 2.3 km | MPC · JPL |
| 593564 | 2015 RT_{27} | — | August 16, 2009 | Catalina | CSS | · | 2.5 km | MPC · JPL |
| 593565 | 2015 RT_{28} | — | July 25, 2015 | Haleakala | Pan-STARRS 1 | · | 2.6 km | MPC · JPL |
| 593566 | 2015 RU_{28} | — | September 13, 2004 | Socorro | LINEAR | LIX | 2.9 km | MPC · JPL |
| 593567 | 2015 RD_{32} | — | April 21, 2003 | Kitt Peak | Spacewatch | · | 3.2 km | MPC · JPL |
| 593568 | 2015 RZ_{40} | — | April 6, 2014 | Kitt Peak | Spacewatch | · | 2.5 km | MPC · JPL |
| 593569 | 2015 RK_{44} | — | February 23, 2007 | Mount Lemmon | Mount Lemmon Survey | · | 2.9 km | MPC · JPL |
| 593570 | 2015 RA_{51} | — | August 15, 2009 | Kitt Peak | Spacewatch | · | 2.8 km | MPC · JPL |
| 593571 | 2015 RV_{52} | — | September 17, 2004 | Drebach | ~Knöfel, A. | · | 2.9 km | MPC · JPL |
| 593572 | 2015 RA_{59} | — | January 22, 2012 | Haleakala | Pan-STARRS 1 | · | 2.9 km | MPC · JPL |
| 593573 | 2015 RL_{59} | — | February 21, 2007 | Kitt Peak | Spacewatch | · | 2.0 km | MPC · JPL |
| 593574 | 2015 RG_{61} | — | August 15, 2009 | Kitt Peak | Spacewatch | · | 2.2 km | MPC · JPL |
| 593575 | 2015 RW_{62} | — | November 15, 2010 | Mount Lemmon | Mount Lemmon Survey | · | 2.3 km | MPC · JPL |
| 593576 | 2015 RM_{70} | — | October 29, 2010 | Mount Lemmon | Mount Lemmon Survey | · | 2.5 km | MPC · JPL |
| 593577 | 2015 RY_{70} | — | June 26, 2015 | Haleakala | Pan-STARRS 1 | · | 2.5 km | MPC · JPL |
| 593578 | 2015 RQ_{72} | — | July 23, 2015 | Haleakala | Pan-STARRS 1 | URS | 2.5 km | MPC · JPL |
| 593579 | 2015 RL_{76} | — | March 13, 2013 | Haleakala | Pan-STARRS 1 | · | 2.8 km | MPC · JPL |
| 593580 | 2015 RQ_{80} | — | March 16, 2013 | Kitt Peak | Spacewatch | URS | 2.5 km | MPC · JPL |
| 593581 | 2015 RP_{85} | — | September 10, 2004 | Socorro | LINEAR | · | 2.7 km | MPC · JPL |
| 593582 | 2015 RF_{86} | — | August 13, 2004 | Palomar | NEAT | · | 3.5 km | MPC · JPL |
| 593583 | 2015 RG_{86} | — | October 11, 2010 | Mount Lemmon | Mount Lemmon Survey | · | 2.8 km | MPC · JPL |
| 593584 | 2015 RF_{88} | — | August 15, 2009 | Catalina | CSS | (1118) | 3.6 km | MPC · JPL |
| 593585 | 2015 RJ_{96} | — | February 19, 2007 | Mount Lemmon | Mount Lemmon Survey | · | 3.9 km | MPC · JPL |
| 593586 | 2015 RH_{98} | — | March 6, 2013 | Haleakala | Pan-STARRS 1 | · | 2.8 km | MPC · JPL |
| 593587 | 2015 RF_{99} | — | February 21, 2007 | Mount Lemmon | Mount Lemmon Survey | EOS | 1.5 km | MPC · JPL |
| 593588 | 2015 RH_{113} | — | September 14, 1998 | Kitt Peak | Spacewatch | · | 2.7 km | MPC · JPL |
| 593589 | 2015 RM_{114} | — | April 14, 2008 | Mount Lemmon | Mount Lemmon Survey | · | 2.4 km | MPC · JPL |
| 593590 | 2015 RZ_{114} | — | April 5, 2008 | Mount Lemmon | Mount Lemmon Survey | · | 2.8 km | MPC · JPL |
| 593591 | 2015 RC_{119} | — | January 5, 2006 | Kitt Peak | Spacewatch | EUP | 2.8 km | MPC · JPL |
| 593592 | 2015 RE_{120} | — | October 4, 1999 | Kitt Peak | Spacewatch | · | 2.8 km | MPC · JPL |
| 593593 | 2015 RJ_{121} | — | January 29, 2012 | Mount Lemmon | Mount Lemmon Survey | · | 3.9 km | MPC · JPL |
| 593594 | 2015 RL_{128} | — | November 16, 2010 | Mount Lemmon | Mount Lemmon Survey | URS | 2.7 km | MPC · JPL |
| 593595 | 2015 RZ_{132} | — | August 21, 2015 | Haleakala | Pan-STARRS 1 | VER | 2.0 km | MPC · JPL |
| 593596 | 2015 RN_{147} | — | October 31, 2010 | Mount Lemmon | Mount Lemmon Survey | HYG | 2.0 km | MPC · JPL |
| 593597 | 2015 RD_{173} | — | September 9, 2015 | Haleakala | Pan-STARRS 1 | · | 2.0 km | MPC · JPL |
| 593598 | 2015 RH_{183} | — | March 8, 2013 | Haleakala | Pan-STARRS 1 | · | 2.5 km | MPC · JPL |
| 593599 | 2015 RZ_{185} | — | April 7, 2007 | Mount Lemmon | Mount Lemmon Survey | · | 3.0 km | MPC · JPL |
| 593600 | 2015 RK_{193} | — | October 7, 2004 | Kitt Peak | Spacewatch | · | 1.9 km | MPC · JPL |

== 593601–593700 ==
back to top

| Designation | | | Discovery | | | Properties | | Ref |
| Permanent | Provisional | Named after | Date | Site | Discoverer(s) | Category | Diam. | Ref |
|---|---|---|---|---|---|---|---|---|
| 593601 | 2015 RC_{206} | — | March 15, 2007 | Kitt Peak | Spacewatch | · | 2.7 km | MPC · JPL |
| 593602 | 2015 RQ_{211} | — | September 13, 2005 | Kitt Peak | Spacewatch | EOS | 1.6 km | MPC · JPL |
| 593603 | 2015 RM_{212} | — | August 23, 2004 | Kitt Peak | Spacewatch | HYG | 2.4 km | MPC · JPL |
| 593604 | 2015 RX_{213} | — | February 25, 2007 | Kitt Peak | Spacewatch | · | 2.6 km | MPC · JPL |
| 593605 | 2015 RV_{226} | — | September 11, 2015 | Haleakala | Pan-STARRS 1 | · | 2.9 km | MPC · JPL |
| 593606 | 2015 RP_{232} | — | September 20, 1998 | Kitt Peak | Spacewatch | · | 2.3 km | MPC · JPL |
| 593607 | 2015 RL_{243} | — | February 27, 2012 | Haleakala | Pan-STARRS 1 | · | 3.0 km | MPC · JPL |
| 593608 | 2015 RN_{243} | — | July 25, 2015 | Haleakala | Pan-STARRS 1 | EOS | 1.8 km | MPC · JPL |
| 593609 | 2015 RL_{244} | — | June 26, 2015 | Haleakala | Pan-STARRS 1 | · | 2.8 km | MPC · JPL |
| 593610 | 2015 RU_{256} | — | August 8, 2004 | Palomar | NEAT | EOS | 1.9 km | MPC · JPL |
| 593611 | 2015 RC_{260} | — | November 9, 2009 | Mount Lemmon | Mount Lemmon Survey | · | 2.9 km | MPC · JPL |
| 593612 | 2015 RZ_{260} | — | May 8, 2014 | Haleakala | Pan-STARRS 1 | 615 | 1.2 km | MPC · JPL |
| 593613 | 2015 RQ_{263} | — | November 14, 2010 | Kitt Peak | Spacewatch | · | 2.4 km | MPC · JPL |
| 593614 | 2015 RU_{271} | — | September 11, 2015 | Haleakala | Pan-STARRS 1 | · | 2.7 km | MPC · JPL |
| 593615 | 2015 RD_{274} | — | February 17, 2013 | Mount Lemmon | Mount Lemmon Survey | · | 2.9 km | MPC · JPL |
| 593616 | 2015 RG_{277} | — | September 9, 2015 | Mauna Kea | OSSOS | cubewano (hot) | 179 km | MPC · JPL |
| 593617 | 2015 RN_{278} | — | August 9, 2005 | Cerro Tololo | Deep Ecliptic Survey | res · 4:5 | 70 km | MPC · JPL |
| 593618 | 2015 RT_{290} | — | September 12, 2015 | Haleakala | Pan-STARRS 1 | · | 3.2 km | MPC · JPL |
| 593619 | 2015 RW_{301} | — | September 11, 2015 | Haleakala | Pan-STARRS 1 | · | 2.5 km | MPC · JPL |
| 593620 | 2015 RM_{309} | — | September 11, 2015 | Haleakala | Pan-STARRS 1 | · | 2.1 km | MPC · JPL |
| 593621 | 2015 SR_{3} | — | July 23, 2003 | Palomar | NEAT | · | 3.8 km | MPC · JPL |
| 593622 | 2015 SM_{4} | — | September 18, 2015 | Catalina | CSS | · | 2.9 km | MPC · JPL |
| 593623 | 2015 SS_{19} | — | August 21, 2015 | Haleakala | Pan-STARRS 1 | · | 2.5 km | MPC · JPL |
| 593624 | 2015 SM_{23} | — | November 28, 2010 | Catalina | CSS | · | 3.1 km | MPC · JPL |
| 593625 | 2015 SZ_{24} | — | September 23, 2015 | Haleakala | Pan-STARRS 1 | · | 2.3 km | MPC · JPL |
| 593626 | 2015 SM_{27} | — | September 23, 2015 | Haleakala | Pan-STARRS 1 | · | 2.5 km | MPC · JPL |
| 593627 | 2015 SN_{30} | — | March 15, 2012 | Mount Lemmon | Mount Lemmon Survey | (1298) | 2.7 km | MPC · JPL |
| 593628 | 2015 TF_{8} | — | December 24, 2011 | Mount Lemmon | Mount Lemmon Survey | · | 2.7 km | MPC · JPL |
| 593629 | 2015 TG_{8} | — | October 28, 2005 | Kitt Peak | Spacewatch | · | 3.4 km | MPC · JPL |
| 593630 | 2015 TD_{9} | — | December 10, 2005 | Kitt Peak | Spacewatch | · | 3.2 km | MPC · JPL |
| 593631 | 2015 TZ_{9} | — | January 27, 2007 | Kitt Peak | Spacewatch | · | 3.3 km | MPC · JPL |
| 593632 | 2015 TU_{11} | — | November 2, 2010 | Mount Lemmon | Mount Lemmon Survey | VER | 2.3 km | MPC · JPL |
| 593633 | 2015 TC_{13} | — | August 25, 2004 | Kitt Peak | Spacewatch | · | 2.1 km | MPC · JPL |
| 593634 | 2015 TA_{15} | — | May 3, 2014 | Haleakala | Pan-STARRS 1 | EOS | 1.8 km | MPC · JPL |
| 593635 | 2015 TH_{15} | — | May 21, 2014 | Haleakala | Pan-STARRS 1 | EOS | 1.5 km | MPC · JPL |
| 593636 | 2015 TS_{15} | — | October 11, 2010 | Mount Lemmon | Mount Lemmon Survey | VER | 2.6 km | MPC · JPL |
| 593637 | 2015 TV_{15} | — | March 13, 1996 | Kitt Peak | Spacewatch | · | 2.8 km | MPC · JPL |
| 593638 | 2015 TT_{28} | — | August 12, 2015 | Haleakala | Pan-STARRS 1 | · | 2.2 km | MPC · JPL |
| 593639 | 2015 TN_{30} | — | December 24, 2005 | Kitt Peak | Spacewatch | · | 2.7 km | MPC · JPL |
| 593640 | 2015 TC_{32} | — | May 25, 2014 | Haleakala | Pan-STARRS 1 | · | 2.0 km | MPC · JPL |
| 593641 | 2015 TG_{32} | — | May 5, 2014 | Haleakala | Pan-STARRS 1 | · | 2.6 km | MPC · JPL |
| 593642 | 2015 TD_{35} | — | May 10, 2014 | Kitt Peak | Spacewatch | · | 2.6 km | MPC · JPL |
| 593643 | 2015 TY_{35} | — | October 8, 2015 | Haleakala | Pan-STARRS 1 | · | 3.0 km | MPC · JPL |
| 593644 | 2015 TS_{37} | — | July 7, 2014 | Haleakala | Pan-STARRS 1 | · | 3.1 km | MPC · JPL |
| 593645 | 2015 TC_{38} | — | May 28, 2014 | Haleakala | Pan-STARRS 1 | · | 2.3 km | MPC · JPL |
| 593646 | 2015 TY_{39} | — | December 8, 2005 | Kitt Peak | Spacewatch | · | 3.0 km | MPC · JPL |
| 593647 | 2015 TD_{41} | — | November 12, 2010 | Mount Lemmon | Mount Lemmon Survey | EOS | 1.7 km | MPC · JPL |
| 593648 | 2015 TK_{41} | — | November 26, 2005 | Kitt Peak | Spacewatch | VER | 2.9 km | MPC · JPL |
| 593649 | 2015 TX_{42} | — | November 3, 2010 | Mount Lemmon | Mount Lemmon Survey | VER | 2.8 km | MPC · JPL |
| 593650 | 2015 TO_{47} | — | September 17, 2006 | Kitt Peak | Spacewatch | · | 1.4 km | MPC · JPL |
| 593651 | 2015 TQ_{48} | — | February 23, 2007 | Mount Lemmon | Mount Lemmon Survey | VER | 2.2 km | MPC · JPL |
| 593652 | 2015 TP_{51} | — | December 21, 2005 | Kitt Peak | Spacewatch | · | 3.6 km | MPC · JPL |
| 593653 | 2015 TL_{53} | — | October 17, 2010 | Mount Lemmon | Mount Lemmon Survey | EOS | 2.0 km | MPC · JPL |
| 593654 | 2015 TO_{53} | — | May 7, 2008 | Kitt Peak | Spacewatch | · | 2.6 km | MPC · JPL |
| 593655 | 2015 TF_{57} | — | April 10, 2013 | Haleakala | Pan-STARRS 1 | TIR | 2.5 km | MPC · JPL |
| 593656 | 2015 TU_{59} | — | July 25, 2015 | Haleakala | Pan-STARRS 1 | · | 2.6 km | MPC · JPL |
| 593657 | 2015 TX_{64} | — | April 26, 2007 | Kitt Peak | Spacewatch | · | 3.5 km | MPC · JPL |
| 593658 | 2015 TH_{96} | — | April 12, 2004 | Kitt Peak | Spacewatch | · | 570 m | MPC · JPL |
| 593659 | 2015 TX_{109} | — | October 2, 2006 | Mount Lemmon | Mount Lemmon Survey | MAR | 890 m | MPC · JPL |
| 593660 | 2015 TO_{129} | — | January 23, 2011 | Mount Lemmon | Mount Lemmon Survey | · | 2.5 km | MPC · JPL |
| 593661 | 2015 TN_{142} | — | May 11, 2007 | Mount Lemmon | Mount Lemmon Survey | · | 3.8 km | MPC · JPL |
| 593662 | 2015 TV_{145} | — | September 17, 2003 | Kitt Peak | Spacewatch | · | 2.7 km | MPC · JPL |
| 593663 | 2015 TQ_{160} | — | July 25, 2015 | Haleakala | Pan-STARRS 1 | · | 2.8 km | MPC · JPL |
| 593664 | 2015 TR_{160} | — | April 6, 2013 | Mount Lemmon | Mount Lemmon Survey | · | 2.7 km | MPC · JPL |
| 593665 | 2015 TZ_{162} | — | November 15, 2006 | Kitt Peak | Spacewatch | · | 1.8 km | MPC · JPL |
| 593666 | 2015 TQ_{168} | — | October 15, 2004 | Kitt Peak | Spacewatch | · | 3.6 km | MPC · JPL |
| 593667 | 2015 TG_{181} | — | February 13, 2008 | Mount Lemmon | Mount Lemmon Survey | · | 1.8 km | MPC · JPL |
| 593668 | 2015 TT_{181} | — | September 16, 2010 | Kitt Peak | Spacewatch | · | 2.8 km | MPC · JPL |
| 593669 | 2015 TZ_{182} | — | August 18, 2009 | Kitt Peak | Spacewatch | · | 3.1 km | MPC · JPL |
| 593670 | 2015 TK_{189} | — | October 14, 2010 | Mount Lemmon | Mount Lemmon Survey | · | 2.6 km | MPC · JPL |
| 593671 | 2015 TV_{190} | — | December 11, 2010 | Mount Lemmon | Mount Lemmon Survey | · | 2.8 km | MPC · JPL |
| 593672 | 2015 TW_{192} | — | October 4, 2004 | Kitt Peak | Spacewatch | · | 2.4 km | MPC · JPL |
| 593673 | 2015 TA_{195} | — | February 17, 2007 | Mount Lemmon | Mount Lemmon Survey | · | 2.8 km | MPC · JPL |
| 593674 | 2015 TV_{196} | — | April 14, 2007 | Mount Lemmon | Mount Lemmon Survey | T_{j} (2.95) | 4.7 km | MPC · JPL |
| 593675 | 2015 TB_{197} | — | September 20, 2003 | Kitt Peak | Spacewatch | · | 3.8 km | MPC · JPL |
| 593676 | 2015 TW_{201} | — | October 7, 2004 | Kitt Peak | Spacewatch | · | 3.8 km | MPC · JPL |
| 593677 | 2015 TK_{202} | — | November 17, 2010 | Mount Lemmon | Mount Lemmon Survey | LIX | 3.0 km | MPC · JPL |
| 593678 | 2015 TL_{205} | — | June 24, 2009 | Mount Lemmon | Mount Lemmon Survey | · | 3.5 km | MPC · JPL |
| 593679 | 2015 TM_{205} | — | December 7, 2005 | Kitt Peak | Spacewatch | EOS | 2.1 km | MPC · JPL |
| 593680 | 2015 TY_{205} | — | October 10, 2015 | Oukaïmeden | C. Rinner | · | 2.5 km | MPC · JPL |
| 593681 | 2015 TP_{208} | — | August 20, 2003 | Palomar | NEAT | · | 4.0 km | MPC · JPL |
| 593682 | 2015 TE_{212} | — | October 17, 2010 | Kitt Peak | Spacewatch | EOS | 1.8 km | MPC · JPL |
| 593683 | 2015 TX_{213} | — | September 25, 2015 | Mount Lemmon | Mount Lemmon Survey | · | 2.4 km | MPC · JPL |
| 593684 | 2015 TC_{215} | — | August 20, 2009 | Kitt Peak | Spacewatch | · | 3.3 km | MPC · JPL |
| 593685 | 2015 TJ_{233} | — | September 16, 2004 | Socorro | LINEAR | · | 3.4 km | MPC · JPL |
| 593686 | 2015 TP_{233} | — | February 27, 2006 | Mount Lemmon | Mount Lemmon Survey | · | 2.8 km | MPC · JPL |
| 593687 | 2015 TC_{240} | — | November 12, 2010 | Kitt Peak | Spacewatch | · | 2.6 km | MPC · JPL |
| 593688 | 2015 TY_{240} | — | September 4, 2010 | Kitt Peak | Spacewatch | · | 3.0 km | MPC · JPL |
| 593689 | 2015 TL_{241} | — | February 16, 2012 | Haleakala | Pan-STARRS 1 | · | 3.1 km | MPC · JPL |
| 593690 | 2015 TU_{241} | — | October 19, 1999 | Kitt Peak | Spacewatch | · | 2.2 km | MPC · JPL |
| 593691 | 2015 TJ_{242} | — | March 16, 2007 | Mount Lemmon | Mount Lemmon Survey | · | 570 m | MPC · JPL |
| 593692 | 2015 TV_{246} | — | September 6, 2015 | Haleakala | Pan-STARRS 1 | · | 2.7 km | MPC · JPL |
| 593693 | 2015 TE_{252} | — | September 15, 2006 | Kitt Peak | Spacewatch | · | 1.1 km | MPC · JPL |
| 593694 | 2015 TL_{252} | — | March 16, 2012 | Haleakala | Pan-STARRS 1 | · | 3.1 km | MPC · JPL |
| 593695 | 2015 TT_{259} | — | October 3, 2015 | Catalina | CSS | T_{j} (2.98) | 3.3 km | MPC · JPL |
| 593696 | 2015 TV_{262} | — | October 12, 2015 | Haleakala | Pan-STARRS 1 | · | 3.2 km | MPC · JPL |
| 593697 | 2015 TX_{262} | — | October 9, 2010 | Mount Lemmon | Mount Lemmon Survey | · | 3.1 km | MPC · JPL |
| 593698 | 2015 TK_{263} | — | February 18, 2013 | Kitt Peak | Spacewatch | · | 3.3 km | MPC · JPL |
| 593699 | 2015 TQ_{265} | — | October 12, 2015 | Haleakala | Pan-STARRS 1 | · | 2.2 km | MPC · JPL |
| 593700 | 2015 TT_{265} | — | February 2, 2001 | Kitt Peak | Spacewatch | VER | 2.6 km | MPC · JPL |

== 593701–593800 ==
back to top

| Designation | | | Discovery | | | Properties | | Ref |
| Permanent | Provisional | Named after | Date | Site | Discoverer(s) | Category | Diam. | Ref |
|---|---|---|---|---|---|---|---|---|
| 593701 | 2015 TM_{266} | — | February 24, 2012 | Mount Lemmon | Mount Lemmon Survey | · | 2.4 km | MPC · JPL |
| 593702 | 2015 TM_{268} | — | September 24, 2015 | Catalina | CSS | · | 2.7 km | MPC · JPL |
| 593703 | 2015 TX_{279} | — | November 1, 2005 | Mount Lemmon | Mount Lemmon Survey | EOS | 1.9 km | MPC · JPL |
| 593704 | 2015 TF_{280} | — | February 28, 2006 | Catalina | CSS | T_{j} (2.99) | 3.4 km | MPC · JPL |
| 593705 | 2015 TD_{284} | — | September 20, 2009 | Mount Lemmon | Mount Lemmon Survey | · | 3.3 km | MPC · JPL |
| 593706 | 2015 TL_{285} | — | November 6, 2010 | Mount Lemmon | Mount Lemmon Survey | ELF | 3.2 km | MPC · JPL |
| 593707 | 2015 TM_{285} | — | November 15, 2010 | Mount Lemmon | Mount Lemmon Survey | · | 2.5 km | MPC · JPL |
| 593708 | 2015 TJ_{290} | — | August 20, 2009 | Kitt Peak | Spacewatch | · | 2.7 km | MPC · JPL |
| 593709 | 2015 TH_{295} | — | October 3, 2015 | Catalina | CSS | · | 2.2 km | MPC · JPL |
| 593710 | 2015 TK_{298} | — | December 10, 2004 | Socorro | LINEAR | · | 3.5 km | MPC · JPL |
| 593711 | 2015 TR_{316} | — | October 13, 2015 | Mount Lemmon | Mount Lemmon Survey | · | 480 m | MPC · JPL |
| 593712 | 2015 TT_{316} | — | September 30, 2003 | Kitt Peak | Spacewatch | · | 3.7 km | MPC · JPL |
| 593713 | 2015 TE_{322} | — | March 13, 2007 | Kitt Peak | Spacewatch | · | 2.6 km | MPC · JPL |
| 593714 | 2015 TU_{325} | — | April 25, 2007 | Kitt Peak | Spacewatch | · | 2.7 km | MPC · JPL |
| 593715 | 2015 TM_{340} | — | October 30, 2005 | Mount Lemmon | Mount Lemmon Survey | · | 3.1 km | MPC · JPL |
| 593716 | 2015 TJ_{346} | — | August 21, 2015 | Haleakala | Pan-STARRS 1 | · | 2.8 km | MPC · JPL |
| 593717 | 2015 TQ_{366} | — | May 5, 2013 | Haleakala | Pan-STARRS 1 | EUP | 3.3 km | MPC · JPL |
| 593718 | 2015 TV_{366} | — | October 9, 2015 | Haleakala | Pan-STARRS 1 | SYL | 3.8 km | MPC · JPL |
| 593719 | 2015 TK_{367} | — | September 19, 2009 | Mount Lemmon | Mount Lemmon Survey | · | 2.5 km | MPC · JPL |
| 593720 | 2015 TW_{369} | — | September 28, 2009 | Mount Lemmon | Mount Lemmon Survey | · | 2.7 km | MPC · JPL |
| 593721 | 2015 TR_{372} | — | May 21, 2014 | Haleakala | Pan-STARRS 1 | · | 470 m | MPC · JPL |
| 593722 | 2015 TJ_{385} | — | October 13, 2015 | Haleakala | Pan-STARRS 1 | · | 2.6 km | MPC · JPL |
| 593723 | 2015 TU_{385} | — | October 9, 2015 | ISON-SSO | L. Elenin | · | 3.3 km | MPC · JPL |
| 593724 | 2015 TU_{386} | — | October 9, 2015 | Haleakala | Pan-STARRS 1 | · | 580 m | MPC · JPL |
| 593725 | 2015 TE_{411} | — | October 8, 2015 | Catalina | CSS | · | 2.4 km | MPC · JPL |
| 593726 | 2015 TJ_{414} | — | October 1, 2015 | Mount Lemmon | Mount Lemmon Survey | · | 2.5 km | MPC · JPL |
| 593727 | 2015 TO_{436} | — | October 15, 2015 | Haleakala | Pan-STARRS 1 | · | 1.5 km | MPC · JPL |
| 593728 | 2015 UE_{5} | — | September 5, 2010 | Mount Lemmon | Mount Lemmon Survey | · | 2.6 km | MPC · JPL |
| 593729 | 2015 UK_{7} | — | December 6, 2010 | Mount Lemmon | Mount Lemmon Survey | LIX | 2.9 km | MPC · JPL |
| 593730 | 2015 UT_{40} | — | October 10, 2015 | Kitt Peak | Spacewatch | · | 2.3 km | MPC · JPL |
| 593731 | 2015 UA_{53} | — | August 17, 2009 | Kitt Peak | Spacewatch | · | 2.8 km | MPC · JPL |
| 593732 | 2015 UD_{55} | — | September 29, 2005 | Mount Lemmon | Mount Lemmon Survey | KOR | 1.1 km | MPC · JPL |
| 593733 | 2015 UA_{62} | — | June 26, 2015 | Haleakala | Pan-STARRS 1 | · | 3.0 km | MPC · JPL |
| 593734 | 2015 UB_{67} | — | September 25, 1998 | Kitt Peak | Spacewatch | · | 960 m | MPC · JPL |
| 593735 | 2015 UQ_{68} | — | November 2, 2010 | Kitt Peak | Spacewatch | · | 2.5 km | MPC · JPL |
| 593736 | 2015 UG_{69} | — | March 2, 2008 | Mount Lemmon | Mount Lemmon Survey | · | 3.4 km | MPC · JPL |
| 593737 | 2015 UA_{70} | — | October 22, 2015 | Haleakala | Pan-STARRS 1 | · | 2.5 km | MPC · JPL |
| 593738 | 2015 UG_{71} | — | October 22, 2015 | Haleakala | Pan-STARRS 1 | EOS | 1.5 km | MPC · JPL |
| 593739 | 2015 UX_{71} | — | December 2, 2010 | Mount Lemmon | Mount Lemmon Survey | · | 2.3 km | MPC · JPL |
| 593740 | 2015 UN_{72} | — | April 10, 2013 | Haleakala | Pan-STARRS 1 | · | 2.3 km | MPC · JPL |
| 593741 | 2015 UR_{78} | — | November 15, 2010 | Mount Lemmon | Mount Lemmon Survey | · | 3.1 km | MPC · JPL |
| 593742 | 2015 VV_{3} | — | November 6, 2010 | Mount Lemmon | Mount Lemmon Survey | · | 2.9 km | MPC · JPL |
| 593743 | 2015 VE_{13} | — | September 18, 2015 | Mount Lemmon | Mount Lemmon Survey | · | 2.4 km | MPC · JPL |
| 593744 | 2015 VN_{16} | — | September 12, 2015 | Haleakala | Pan-STARRS 1 | EOS | 1.6 km | MPC · JPL |
| 593745 | 2015 VL_{22} | — | February 27, 2012 | Haleakala | Pan-STARRS 1 | · | 2.7 km | MPC · JPL |
| 593746 | 2015 VA_{27} | — | September 15, 2009 | Catalina | CSS | · | 2.7 km | MPC · JPL |
| 593747 | 2015 VK_{27} | — | June 7, 2013 | Haleakala | Pan-STARRS 1 | VER | 2.8 km | MPC · JPL |
| 593748 | 2015 VV_{27} | — | October 11, 2004 | Kitt Peak | Spacewatch | · | 3.1 km | MPC · JPL |
| 593749 | 2015 VJ_{43} | — | December 1, 2005 | Mount Lemmon | Mount Lemmon Survey | · | 2.5 km | MPC · JPL |
| 593750 | 2015 VQ_{43} | — | February 15, 2013 | Haleakala | Pan-STARRS 1 | · | 2.5 km | MPC · JPL |
| 593751 | 2015 VY_{43} | — | October 24, 2005 | Kitt Peak | Spacewatch | · | 2.7 km | MPC · JPL |
| 593752 | 2015 VJ_{44} | — | October 17, 2010 | Mount Lemmon | Mount Lemmon Survey | VER | 2.4 km | MPC · JPL |
| 593753 | 2015 VF_{45} | — | August 22, 2004 | Kitt Peak | Spacewatch | EOS | 1.7 km | MPC · JPL |
| 593754 | 2015 VN_{49} | — | October 17, 2010 | Mount Lemmon | Mount Lemmon Survey | · | 2.9 km | MPC · JPL |
| 593755 | 2015 VQ_{49} | — | February 22, 2007 | Kitt Peak | Spacewatch | · | 3.0 km | MPC · JPL |
| 593756 | 2015 VR_{51} | — | October 29, 2010 | Mount Lemmon | Mount Lemmon Survey | T_{j} (2.93) | 3.1 km | MPC · JPL |
| 593757 | 2015 VQ_{52} | — | December 2, 2010 | Kitt Peak | Spacewatch | TIR | 2.2 km | MPC · JPL |
| 593758 | 2015 VO_{55} | — | February 27, 2012 | Haleakala | Pan-STARRS 1 | · | 2.7 km | MPC · JPL |
| 593759 | 2015 VX_{56} | — | November 2, 2010 | Kitt Peak | Spacewatch | · | 2.9 km | MPC · JPL |
| 593760 | 2015 VG_{58} | — | December 2, 2010 | Mount Lemmon | Mount Lemmon Survey | · | 2.8 km | MPC · JPL |
| 593761 | 2015 VQ_{58} | — | June 27, 2014 | Haleakala | Pan-STARRS 1 | · | 2.3 km | MPC · JPL |
| 593762 | 2015 VS_{60} | — | October 13, 2015 | Mount Lemmon | Mount Lemmon Survey | · | 2.4 km | MPC · JPL |
| 593763 | 2015 VC_{67} | — | October 10, 2004 | Kitt Peak | Spacewatch | LIX | 3.1 km | MPC · JPL |
| 593764 | 2015 VC_{73} | — | October 9, 2004 | Kitt Peak | Spacewatch | · | 2.8 km | MPC · JPL |
| 593765 | 2015 VH_{73} | — | July 1, 2014 | Haleakala | Pan-STARRS 1 | · | 3.6 km | MPC · JPL |
| 593766 | 2015 VR_{73} | — | October 31, 2010 | Kitt Peak | Spacewatch | · | 2.4 km | MPC · JPL |
| 593767 | 2015 VP_{80} | — | April 13, 2013 | Haleakala | Pan-STARRS 1 | · | 2.8 km | MPC · JPL |
| 593768 | 2015 VQ_{95} | — | April 28, 2004 | Kitt Peak | Spacewatch | · | 610 m | MPC · JPL |
| 593769 | 2015 VB_{110} | — | October 9, 2015 | ESA OGS | ESA OGS | · | 3.1 km | MPC · JPL |
| 593770 | 2015 VM_{111} | — | December 2, 2010 | Charleston | R. Holmes | · | 3.1 km | MPC · JPL |
| 593771 | 2015 VC_{122} | — | October 11, 2015 | Catalina | CSS | · | 3.4 km | MPC · JPL |
| 593772 | 2015 VH_{125} | — | April 7, 2008 | Kitt Peak | Spacewatch | TIR | 2.7 km | MPC · JPL |
| 593773 | 2015 VW_{126} | — | June 30, 2014 | Haleakala | Pan-STARRS 1 | · | 2.9 km | MPC · JPL |
| 593774 | 2015 VA_{133} | — | September 28, 2009 | Kitt Peak | Spacewatch | THM | 2.7 km | MPC · JPL |
| 593775 | 2015 VV_{133} | — | March 3, 2000 | Catalina | CSS | THB | 3.3 km | MPC · JPL |
| 593776 | 2015 VC_{141} | — | September 19, 2003 | Palomar | NEAT | · | 4.0 km | MPC · JPL |
| 593777 | 2015 VN_{143} | — | May 8, 2008 | Mount Lemmon | Mount Lemmon Survey | · | 3.1 km | MPC · JPL |
| 593778 | 2015 VQ_{186} | — | November 6, 2015 | Mount Lemmon | Mount Lemmon Survey | (69559) | 3.4 km | MPC · JPL |
| 593779 | 2015 VZ_{188} | — | November 14, 2015 | Mount Lemmon | Mount Lemmon Survey | LUT | 4.0 km | MPC · JPL |
| 593780 | 2015 VB_{204} | — | November 6, 2015 | Mount Lemmon | Mount Lemmon Survey | EUN | 1.0 km | MPC · JPL |
| 593781 | 2015 WA_{5} | — | January 19, 2013 | Mount Lemmon | Mount Lemmon Survey | · | 510 m | MPC · JPL |
| 593782 | 2015 WX_{13} | — | April 16, 2004 | Kitt Peak | Spacewatch | · | 820 m | MPC · JPL |
| 593783 | 2015 XU_{11} | — | December 5, 2005 | Kitt Peak | Spacewatch | · | 3.1 km | MPC · JPL |
| 593784 | 2015 XE_{14} | — | June 5, 2014 | Haleakala | Pan-STARRS 1 | JUN | 870 m | MPC · JPL |
| 593785 | 2015 XF_{23} | — | January 2, 2011 | Mount Lemmon | Mount Lemmon Survey | · | 2.7 km | MPC · JPL |
| 593786 | 2015 XA_{44} | — | September 21, 2009 | Kitt Peak | Spacewatch | · | 2.3 km | MPC · JPL |
| 593787 | 2015 XH_{59} | — | December 1, 2015 | Haleakala | Pan-STARRS 1 | · | 3.0 km | MPC · JPL |
| 593788 | 2015 XS_{68} | — | July 7, 2014 | Haleakala | Pan-STARRS 1 | SYL | 3.5 km | MPC · JPL |
| 593789 | 2015 XA_{76} | — | January 27, 2007 | Mount Lemmon | Mount Lemmon Survey | · | 800 m | MPC · JPL |
| 593790 | 2015 XZ_{90} | — | November 10, 2015 | Mount Lemmon | Mount Lemmon Survey | · | 530 m | MPC · JPL |
| 593791 | 2015 XZ_{95} | — | October 1, 2005 | Mount Lemmon | Mount Lemmon Survey | · | 610 m | MPC · JPL |
| 593792 | 2015 XF_{136} | — | October 28, 2005 | Kitt Peak | Spacewatch | · | 470 m | MPC · JPL |
| 593793 | 2015 XN_{189} | — | August 29, 2009 | Catalina | CSS | URS | 3.6 km | MPC · JPL |
| 593794 | 2015 XM_{215} | — | April 11, 2003 | Kitt Peak | Spacewatch | · | 540 m | MPC · JPL |
| 593795 | 2015 XB_{221} | — | December 6, 2015 | Mount Lemmon | Mount Lemmon Survey | · | 1.3 km | MPC · JPL |
| 593796 | 2015 XK_{225} | — | October 22, 2006 | Kitt Peak | Spacewatch | MIS | 2.3 km | MPC · JPL |
| 593797 | 2015 XK_{246} | — | July 25, 2015 | Haleakala | Pan-STARRS 1 | · | 3.5 km | MPC · JPL |
| 593798 | 2015 XA_{262} | — | July 30, 2003 | Campo Imperatore | CINEOS | · | 3.9 km | MPC · JPL |
| 593799 | 2015 XP_{310} | — | December 8, 2015 | Mount Lemmon | Mount Lemmon Survey | · | 640 m | MPC · JPL |
| 593800 | 2015 XY_{327} | — | October 10, 2005 | Uccle | P. De Cat | · | 640 m | MPC · JPL |

== 593801–593900 ==
back to top

| Designation | | | Discovery | | | Properties | | Ref |
| Permanent | Provisional | Named after | Date | Site | Discoverer(s) | Category | Diam. | Ref |
|---|---|---|---|---|---|---|---|---|
| 593801 | 2015 XK_{336} | — | February 1, 2013 | Mount Lemmon | Mount Lemmon Survey | · | 630 m | MPC · JPL |
| 593802 | 2015 XO_{348} | — | October 10, 2008 | Mount Lemmon | Mount Lemmon Survey | · | 580 m | MPC · JPL |
| 593803 | 2015 XG_{350} | — | November 21, 2005 | Kitt Peak | Spacewatch | · | 690 m | MPC · JPL |
| 593804 | 2015 XD_{395} | — | December 13, 2015 | Haleakala | Pan-STARRS 1 | · | 1.0 km | MPC · JPL |
| 593805 | 2015 XK_{413} | — | February 15, 2013 | Haleakala | Pan-STARRS 1 | (2076) | 620 m | MPC · JPL |
| 593806 | 2015 YT_{2} | — | September 28, 2008 | Mount Lemmon | Mount Lemmon Survey | · | 630 m | MPC · JPL |
| 593807 | 2015 YY_{5} | — | March 26, 2003 | Kitt Peak | Spacewatch | · | 490 m | MPC · JPL |
| 593808 | 2015 YG_{8} | — | October 19, 2011 | Kitt Peak | Spacewatch | · | 1.1 km | MPC · JPL |
| 593809 | 2016 AN_{12} | — | December 22, 2008 | Kitt Peak | Spacewatch | · | 780 m | MPC · JPL |
| 593810 | 2016 AM_{19} | — | February 2, 2009 | Kitt Peak | Spacewatch | MAS | 550 m | MPC · JPL |
| 593811 | 2016 AQ_{24} | — | January 31, 2009 | Kitt Peak | Spacewatch | NYS | 800 m | MPC · JPL |
| 593812 | 2016 AR_{25} | — | March 19, 2009 | Kitt Peak | Spacewatch | NYS | 1.0 km | MPC · JPL |
| 593813 | 2016 AT_{28} | — | September 20, 2014 | Haleakala | Pan-STARRS 1 | ERI | 1.2 km | MPC · JPL |
| 593814 | 2016 AL_{29} | — | August 4, 2011 | Siding Spring | SSS | · | 760 m | MPC · JPL |
| 593815 | 2016 AV_{29} | — | October 8, 2008 | Catalina | CSS | · | 590 m | MPC · JPL |
| 593816 | 2016 AF_{33} | — | July 25, 2014 | Haleakala | Pan-STARRS 1 | V | 450 m | MPC · JPL |
| 593817 | 2016 AV_{50} | — | June 11, 2011 | Haleakala | Pan-STARRS 1 | · | 750 m | MPC · JPL |
| 593818 | 2016 AJ_{54} | — | November 28, 2011 | Kitt Peak | Spacewatch | NYS | 1.1 km | MPC · JPL |
| 593819 | 2016 AK_{57} | — | February 4, 2009 | Mount Lemmon | Mount Lemmon Survey | · | 1.0 km | MPC · JPL |
| 593820 | 2016 AB_{59} | — | December 21, 2008 | Piszkéstető | K. Sárneczky | · | 860 m | MPC · JPL |
| 593821 | 2016 AR_{59} | — | February 3, 2013 | Haleakala | Pan-STARRS 1 | · | 610 m | MPC · JPL |
| 593822 | 2016 AB_{62} | — | January 23, 2006 | Kitt Peak | Spacewatch | · | 580 m | MPC · JPL |
| 593823 | 2016 AJ_{75} | — | June 7, 2013 | Haleakala | Pan-STARRS 1 | · | 880 m | MPC · JPL |
| 593824 | 2016 AN_{75} | — | January 4, 2016 | Haleakala | Pan-STARRS 1 | · | 1.2 km | MPC · JPL |
| 593825 | 2016 AX_{81} | — | February 2, 2009 | Kitt Peak | Spacewatch | · | 870 m | MPC · JPL |
| 593826 | 2016 AG_{93} | — | September 25, 2008 | Kitt Peak | Spacewatch | · | 530 m | MPC · JPL |
| 593827 | 2016 AZ_{93} | — | November 2, 2007 | Mount Lemmon | Mount Lemmon Survey | V | 520 m | MPC · JPL |
| 593828 | 2016 AU_{96} | — | April 24, 2003 | Kitt Peak | Spacewatch | · | 790 m | MPC · JPL |
| 593829 | 2016 AC_{98} | — | September 18, 2014 | Haleakala | Pan-STARRS 1 | · | 880 m | MPC · JPL |
| 593830 | 2016 AE_{102} | — | November 30, 2011 | Mount Lemmon | Mount Lemmon Survey | · | 800 m | MPC · JPL |
| 593831 | 2016 AJ_{107} | — | September 16, 2007 | Charleston | R. Holmes | · | 760 m | MPC · JPL |
| 593832 | 2016 AX_{114} | — | January 14, 2012 | Mount Lemmon | Mount Lemmon Survey | · | 1.2 km | MPC · JPL |
| 593833 | 2016 AO_{117} | — | April 18, 2009 | Kitt Peak | Spacewatch | · | 840 m | MPC · JPL |
| 593834 | 2016 AQ_{117} | — | January 8, 2016 | Haleakala | Pan-STARRS 1 | · | 830 m | MPC · JPL |
| 593835 | 2016 AB_{118} | — | August 22, 2014 | Haleakala | Pan-STARRS 1 | · | 550 m | MPC · JPL |
| 593836 | 2016 AM_{118} | — | January 8, 2016 | Haleakala | Pan-STARRS 1 | V | 570 m | MPC · JPL |
| 593837 | 2016 AY_{125} | — | July 25, 2014 | Haleakala | Pan-STARRS 1 | · | 550 m | MPC · JPL |
| 593838 | 2016 AP_{126} | — | March 1, 2009 | Mount Lemmon | Mount Lemmon Survey | · | 700 m | MPC · JPL |
| 593839 | 2016 AW_{136} | — | January 9, 2016 | Haleakala | Pan-STARRS 1 | · | 590 m | MPC · JPL |
| 593840 | 2016 AD_{168} | — | October 24, 2011 | Haleakala | Pan-STARRS 1 | · | 660 m | MPC · JPL |
| 593841 | 2016 AP_{170} | — | November 30, 2011 | Kitt Peak | Spacewatch | V | 540 m | MPC · JPL |
| 593842 | 2016 AW_{190} | — | July 8, 2014 | Haleakala | Pan-STARRS 1 | · | 510 m | MPC · JPL |
| 593843 | 2016 AT_{191} | — | August 23, 2003 | Palomar | NEAT | V | 720 m | MPC · JPL |
| 593844 | 2016 AH_{207} | — | January 7, 2016 | Haleakala | Pan-STARRS 1 | PHO | 690 m | MPC · JPL |
| 593845 | 2016 AW_{216} | — | June 7, 2013 | Haleakala | Pan-STARRS 1 | MAS | 620 m | MPC · JPL |
| 593846 | 2016 AK_{217} | — | January 7, 2016 | Haleakala | Pan-STARRS 1 | · | 1.0 km | MPC · JPL |
| 593847 | 2016 AR_{219} | — | February 20, 2006 | Mount Lemmon | Mount Lemmon Survey | · | 630 m | MPC · JPL |
| 593848 | 2016 AJ_{220} | — | January 12, 2016 | Haleakala | Pan-STARRS 1 | · | 600 m | MPC · JPL |
| 593849 | 2016 AU_{223} | — | September 9, 2007 | Kitt Peak | Spacewatch | · | 700 m | MPC · JPL |
| 593850 | 2016 AM_{224} | — | September 20, 2014 | Haleakala | Pan-STARRS 1 | · | 680 m | MPC · JPL |
| 593851 | 2016 AX_{230} | — | February 19, 2009 | Mount Lemmon | Mount Lemmon Survey | · | 970 m | MPC · JPL |
| 593852 | 2016 AA_{233} | — | January 20, 2009 | Mount Lemmon | Mount Lemmon Survey | · | 810 m | MPC · JPL |
| 593853 | 2016 AV_{245} | — | January 3, 2016 | Haleakala | Pan-STARRS 1 | · | 500 m | MPC · JPL |
| 593854 | 2016 AA_{249} | — | January 4, 2016 | Haleakala | Pan-STARRS 1 | · | 600 m | MPC · JPL |
| 593855 | 2016 AR_{261} | — | February 20, 2009 | Kitt Peak | Spacewatch | · | 770 m | MPC · JPL |
| 593856 | 2016 AY_{270} | — | November 3, 2011 | Mount Lemmon | Mount Lemmon Survey | · | 650 m | MPC · JPL |
| 593857 | 2016 AN_{274} | — | November 9, 2007 | Kitt Peak | Spacewatch | · | 890 m | MPC · JPL |
| 593858 | 2016 AE_{279} | — | January 15, 2016 | Haleakala | Pan-STARRS 1 | PHO | 660 m | MPC · JPL |
| 593859 | 2016 AK_{303} | — | June 4, 2013 | Mount Lemmon | Mount Lemmon Survey | · | 830 m | MPC · JPL |
| 593860 | 2016 AA_{308} | — | January 11, 2016 | Haleakala | Pan-STARRS 1 | · | 740 m | MPC · JPL |
| 593861 | 2016 AM_{308} | — | January 14, 2016 | Haleakala | Pan-STARRS 1 | · | 900 m | MPC · JPL |
| 593862 | 2016 AF_{311} | — | February 4, 2006 | Mount Lemmon | Mount Lemmon Survey | · | 510 m | MPC · JPL |
| 593863 | 2016 AD_{351} | — | January 14, 2016 | Haleakala | Pan-STARRS 1 | · | 1.5 km | MPC · JPL |
| 593864 | 2016 BL_{6} | — | December 25, 2011 | Mount Lemmon | Mount Lemmon Survey | · | 880 m | MPC · JPL |
| 593865 | 2016 BC_{8} | — | January 20, 2012 | Mount Lemmon | Mount Lemmon Survey | · | 880 m | MPC · JPL |
| 593866 | 2016 BY_{16} | — | March 3, 2005 | Kitt Peak | Spacewatch | · | 920 m | MPC · JPL |
| 593867 | 2016 BL_{23} | — | March 20, 2002 | Kitt Peak | Spacewatch | · | 650 m | MPC · JPL |
| 593868 | 2016 BV_{30} | — | March 24, 2009 | Mount Lemmon | Mount Lemmon Survey | · | 740 m | MPC · JPL |
| 593869 | 2016 BG_{33} | — | September 4, 2002 | Palomar | NEAT | PHO | 680 m | MPC · JPL |
| 593870 | 2016 BC_{45} | — | April 4, 2005 | Catalina | CSS | · | 830 m | MPC · JPL |
| 593871 | 2016 BD_{45} | — | February 5, 2009 | Kitt Peak | Spacewatch | · | 670 m | MPC · JPL |
| 593872 | 2016 BR_{46} | — | March 17, 2005 | Kitt Peak | Spacewatch | NYS | 960 m | MPC · JPL |
| 593873 | 2016 BT_{46} | — | January 16, 2005 | Kitt Peak | Spacewatch | · | 740 m | MPC · JPL |
| 593874 | 2016 BG_{47} | — | December 28, 2005 | Kitt Peak | Spacewatch | · | 640 m | MPC · JPL |
| 593875 | 2016 BX_{48} | — | July 14, 2013 | Haleakala | Pan-STARRS 1 | URS | 3.1 km | MPC · JPL |
| 593876 | 2016 BZ_{49} | — | February 1, 2009 | Kitt Peak | Spacewatch | · | 670 m | MPC · JPL |
| 593877 | 2016 BK_{51} | — | October 23, 2011 | Mount Lemmon | Mount Lemmon Survey | · | 490 m | MPC · JPL |
| 593878 | 2016 BA_{53} | — | March 3, 2005 | Catalina | CSS | NYS | 1.1 km | MPC · JPL |
| 593879 | 2016 BC_{59} | — | May 4, 2009 | Mount Lemmon | Mount Lemmon Survey | · | 910 m | MPC · JPL |
| 593880 | 2016 BB_{60} | — | February 24, 2009 | Kitt Peak | Spacewatch | MAS | 650 m | MPC · JPL |
| 593881 | 2016 BB_{62} | — | March 6, 2013 | Haleakala | Pan-STARRS 1 | · | 610 m | MPC · JPL |
| 593882 | 2016 BD_{77} | — | April 4, 2005 | Mount Lemmon | Mount Lemmon Survey | NYS | 870 m | MPC · JPL |
| 593883 | 2016 BW_{92} | — | January 17, 2016 | Haleakala | Pan-STARRS 1 | · | 810 m | MPC · JPL |
| 593884 | 2016 BL_{96} | — | January 15, 2009 | Kitt Peak | Spacewatch | · | 550 m | MPC · JPL |
| 593885 | 2016 BE_{100} | — | November 16, 2003 | Kitt Peak | Spacewatch | CLA | 1.5 km | MPC · JPL |
| 593886 | 2016 BB_{101} | — | February 11, 2012 | Mount Lemmon | Mount Lemmon Survey | MAS | 550 m | MPC · JPL |
| 593887 | 2016 BX_{113} | — | January 17, 2016 | Haleakala | Pan-STARRS 1 | · | 1.0 km | MPC · JPL |
| 593888 | 2016 BE_{115} | — | January 17, 2016 | Haleakala | Pan-STARRS 1 | · | 890 m | MPC · JPL |
| 593889 | 2016 BF_{115} | — | January 17, 2016 | Haleakala | Pan-STARRS 1 | · | 840 m | MPC · JPL |
| 593890 | 2016 BL_{116} | — | January 17, 2016 | Haleakala | Pan-STARRS 1 | T_{j} (2.91) | 4.0 km | MPC · JPL |
| 593891 | 2016 CD_{3} | — | April 30, 2009 | Kitt Peak | Spacewatch | · | 910 m | MPC · JPL |
| 593892 | 2016 CH_{6} | — | June 22, 2010 | Mount Lemmon | Mount Lemmon Survey | V | 600 m | MPC · JPL |
| 593893 | 2016 CY_{7} | — | February 3, 2009 | Kitt Peak | Spacewatch | NYS | 1.1 km | MPC · JPL |
| 593894 | 2016 CR_{8} | — | February 6, 2005 | Bergisch Gladbach | W. Bickel | · | 1 km | MPC · JPL |
| 593895 | 2016 CA_{10} | — | January 15, 2016 | Haleakala | Pan-STARRS 1 | · | 770 m | MPC · JPL |
| 593896 | 2016 CA_{14} | — | November 3, 2007 | Kitt Peak | Spacewatch | NYS | 1.1 km | MPC · JPL |
| 593897 | 2016 CX_{14} | — | February 3, 2009 | Mount Lemmon | Mount Lemmon Survey | · | 780 m | MPC · JPL |
| 593898 | 2016 CR_{20} | — | February 1, 2016 | Haleakala | Pan-STARRS 1 | · | 1.2 km | MPC · JPL |
| 593899 | 2016 CT_{20} | — | September 19, 2014 | Haleakala | Pan-STARRS 1 | · | 670 m | MPC · JPL |
| 593900 | 2016 CV_{22} | — | April 16, 2009 | Siding Spring | SSS | · | 1.2 km | MPC · JPL |

== 593901–594000 ==
back to top

| Designation | | | Discovery | | | Properties | | Ref |
| Permanent | Provisional | Named after | Date | Site | Discoverer(s) | Category | Diam. | Ref |
|---|---|---|---|---|---|---|---|---|
| 593901 | 2016 CR_{23} | — | October 27, 2011 | Mount Lemmon | Mount Lemmon Survey | · | 800 m | MPC · JPL |
| 593902 | 2016 CQ_{27} | — | March 18, 2005 | Mount Bigelow | CSS | V | 910 m | MPC · JPL |
| 593903 | 2016 CB_{39} | — | January 2, 2016 | Mount Lemmon | Mount Lemmon Survey | · | 510 m | MPC · JPL |
| 593904 | 2016 CC_{40} | — | August 25, 2014 | Haleakala | Pan-STARRS 1 | · | 970 m | MPC · JPL |
| 593905 | 2016 CV_{43} | — | March 1, 2009 | Kitt Peak | Spacewatch | · | 970 m | MPC · JPL |
| 593906 | 2016 CX_{43} | — | September 11, 2007 | Mount Lemmon | Mount Lemmon Survey | V | 450 m | MPC · JPL |
| 593907 | 2016 CO_{63} | — | October 19, 2011 | Mount Lemmon | Mount Lemmon Survey | · | 750 m | MPC · JPL |
| 593908 | 2016 CZ_{69} | — | January 13, 2005 | Nogales | M. Ory | · | 940 m | MPC · JPL |
| 593909 | 2016 CE_{70} | — | March 14, 2005 | Mount Lemmon | Mount Lemmon Survey | NYS | 1.0 km | MPC · JPL |
| 593910 | 2016 CS_{72} | — | November 13, 2007 | Kitt Peak | Spacewatch | MAS | 670 m | MPC · JPL |
| 593911 | 2016 CW_{83} | — | September 29, 2008 | Kitt Peak | Spacewatch | · | 490 m | MPC · JPL |
| 593912 | 2016 CX_{83} | — | March 18, 2009 | Kitt Peak | Spacewatch | · | 1.1 km | MPC · JPL |
| 593913 | 2016 CN_{91} | — | February 5, 2016 | Haleakala | Pan-STARRS 1 | · | 930 m | MPC · JPL |
| 593914 | 2016 CK_{106} | — | May 12, 2013 | Mount Lemmon | Mount Lemmon Survey | V | 470 m | MPC · JPL |
| 593915 | 2016 CT_{108} | — | March 31, 2009 | Kitt Peak | Spacewatch | · | 1.0 km | MPC · JPL |
| 593916 | 2016 CG_{119} | — | October 17, 2014 | Mount Lemmon | Mount Lemmon Survey | · | 650 m | MPC · JPL |
| 593917 | 2016 CL_{120} | — | January 20, 2009 | Mount Lemmon | Mount Lemmon Survey | V | 380 m | MPC · JPL |
| 593918 | 2016 CN_{122} | — | October 24, 2011 | Haleakala | Pan-STARRS 1 | · | 520 m | MPC · JPL |
| 593919 | 2016 CZ_{130} | — | January 15, 2007 | Mauna Kea | P. A. Wiegert | NYS | 1.0 km | MPC · JPL |
| 593920 | 2016 CN_{140} | — | April 21, 2009 | Mount Lemmon | Mount Lemmon Survey | · | 850 m | MPC · JPL |
| 593921 | 2016 CD_{145} | — | March 21, 2009 | Kitt Peak | Spacewatch | · | 1.1 km | MPC · JPL |
| 593922 | 2016 CG_{152} | — | June 5, 2013 | Mount Lemmon | Mount Lemmon Survey | · | 970 m | MPC · JPL |
| 593923 | 2016 CN_{152} | — | September 18, 2011 | Mount Lemmon | Mount Lemmon Survey | · | 510 m | MPC · JPL |
| 593924 | 2016 CO_{153} | — | April 20, 2013 | Kitt Peak | Spacewatch | · | 730 m | MPC · JPL |
| 593925 | 2016 CM_{157} | — | November 3, 2007 | Mount Lemmon | Mount Lemmon Survey | MAS | 560 m | MPC · JPL |
| 593926 | 2016 CA_{159} | — | December 17, 2015 | Haleakala | Pan-STARRS 1 | · | 560 m | MPC · JPL |
| 593927 | 2016 CX_{160} | — | October 15, 2007 | Kitt Peak | Spacewatch | · | 870 m | MPC · JPL |
| 593928 | 2016 CB_{163} | — | September 15, 2007 | Kitt Peak | Spacewatch | · | 890 m | MPC · JPL |
| 593929 | 2016 CQ_{165} | — | September 29, 2011 | Mount Lemmon | Mount Lemmon Survey | · | 500 m | MPC · JPL |
| 593930 | 2016 CS_{183} | — | September 2, 2010 | Mount Lemmon | Mount Lemmon Survey | · | 760 m | MPC · JPL |
| 593931 | 2016 CQ_{192} | — | April 22, 2009 | Mount Lemmon | Mount Lemmon Survey | NYS | 810 m | MPC · JPL |
| 593932 | 2016 CA_{197} | — | May 2, 2006 | Mount Lemmon | Mount Lemmon Survey | · | 860 m | MPC · JPL |
| 593933 | 2016 CD_{198} | — | April 4, 2005 | Mount Lemmon | Mount Lemmon Survey | · | 1.0 km | MPC · JPL |
| 593934 | 2016 CM_{200} | — | October 2, 2014 | Mount Lemmon | Mount Lemmon Survey | · | 570 m | MPC · JPL |
| 593935 | 2016 CJ_{205} | — | December 6, 2011 | Haleakala | Pan-STARRS 1 | · | 930 m | MPC · JPL |
| 593936 | 2016 CB_{206} | — | January 2, 2009 | Kitt Peak | Spacewatch | · | 550 m | MPC · JPL |
| 593937 | 2016 CP_{206} | — | July 25, 2014 | ESA OGS | ESA OGS | · | 610 m | MPC · JPL |
| 593938 | 2016 CQ_{211} | — | February 28, 2009 | Kitt Peak | Spacewatch | · | 700 m | MPC · JPL |
| 593939 | 2016 CS_{221} | — | July 31, 2014 | Haleakala | Pan-STARRS 1 | · | 810 m | MPC · JPL |
| 593940 | 2016 CC_{222} | — | February 9, 2016 | Haleakala | Pan-STARRS 1 | V | 430 m | MPC · JPL |
| 593941 | 2016 CN_{222} | — | February 22, 2009 | Kitt Peak | Spacewatch | V | 510 m | MPC · JPL |
| 593942 | 2016 CK_{233} | — | November 18, 2011 | Mount Lemmon | Mount Lemmon Survey | · | 770 m | MPC · JPL |
| 593943 | 2016 CG_{239} | — | September 6, 2007 | Siding Spring | SSS | PHO | 800 m | MPC · JPL |
| 593944 | 2016 CU_{240} | — | September 29, 2003 | Kitt Peak | Spacewatch | PHO | 740 m | MPC · JPL |
| 593945 | 2016 CY_{249} | — | January 1, 2012 | Mount Lemmon | Mount Lemmon Survey | NYS | 890 m | MPC · JPL |
| 593946 | 2016 CS_{250} | — | October 20, 2007 | Mount Lemmon | Mount Lemmon Survey | · | 890 m | MPC · JPL |
| 593947 | 2016 CU_{251} | — | May 4, 2009 | Mount Lemmon | Mount Lemmon Survey | MAS | 690 m | MPC · JPL |
| 593948 | 2016 CV_{254} | — | March 8, 2005 | Kitt Peak | Spacewatch | · | 980 m | MPC · JPL |
| 593949 | 2016 CC_{255} | — | October 7, 2007 | Mount Lemmon | Mount Lemmon Survey | MAS | 720 m | MPC · JPL |
| 593950 | 2016 CY_{256} | — | January 31, 2016 | Haleakala | Pan-STARRS 1 | PHO | 810 m | MPC · JPL |
| 593951 | 2016 CJ_{259} | — | February 8, 2008 | Kitt Peak | Spacewatch | · | 1.2 km | MPC · JPL |
| 593952 | 2016 CW_{259} | — | May 13, 2008 | Siding Spring | SSS | · | 1.5 km | MPC · JPL |
| 593953 | 2016 CN_{263} | — | September 19, 2003 | Kitt Peak | Spacewatch | V | 790 m | MPC · JPL |
| 593954 | 2016 CP_{263} | — | January 2, 2012 | Mount Lemmon | Mount Lemmon Survey | · | 1.0 km | MPC · JPL |
| 593955 | 2016 CO_{271} | — | February 5, 2016 | Haleakala | Pan-STARRS 1 | · | 980 m | MPC · JPL |
| 593956 | 2016 CW_{271} | — | February 5, 2016 | Haleakala | Pan-STARRS 1 | · | 900 m | MPC · JPL |
| 593957 | 2016 CP_{278} | — | March 11, 2005 | Mount Lemmon | Mount Lemmon Survey | · | 950 m | MPC · JPL |
| 593958 | 2016 CH_{286} | — | September 18, 2010 | Mount Lemmon | Mount Lemmon Survey | · | 1.3 km | MPC · JPL |
| 593959 | 2016 CU_{289} | — | October 26, 2011 | Haleakala | Pan-STARRS 1 | · | 530 m | MPC · JPL |
| 593960 | 2016 CF_{290} | — | March 31, 2009 | Mount Lemmon | Mount Lemmon Survey | · | 830 m | MPC · JPL |
| 593961 | 2016 CO_{292} | — | February 12, 2016 | Mount Lemmon | Mount Lemmon Survey | · | 980 m | MPC · JPL |
| 593962 | 2016 CU_{293} | — | September 29, 2003 | Kitt Peak | Spacewatch | · | 920 m | MPC · JPL |
| 593963 | 2016 CF_{298} | — | February 4, 2016 | Haleakala | Pan-STARRS 1 | · | 740 m | MPC · JPL |
| 593964 | 2016 CC_{299} | — | May 20, 2005 | Mount Lemmon | Mount Lemmon Survey | · | 990 m | MPC · JPL |
| 593965 | 2016 CO_{307} | — | October 24, 2011 | Haleakala | Pan-STARRS 1 | V | 440 m | MPC · JPL |
| 593966 | 2016 CG_{311} | — | January 20, 2012 | Mount Lemmon | Mount Lemmon Survey | · | 840 m | MPC · JPL |
| 593967 | 2016 CC_{321} | — | December 29, 2011 | Mount Lemmon | Mount Lemmon Survey | · | 960 m | MPC · JPL |
| 593968 | 2016 CQ_{321} | — | February 12, 2016 | Haleakala | Pan-STARRS 1 | · | 950 m | MPC · JPL |
| 593969 | 2016 CF_{324} | — | February 5, 2016 | Haleakala | Pan-STARRS 1 | · | 1.1 km | MPC · JPL |
| 593970 | 2016 CT_{324} | — | February 3, 2016 | Haleakala | Pan-STARRS 1 | · | 980 m | MPC · JPL |
| 593971 | 2016 CO_{336} | — | February 11, 2016 | Haleakala | Pan-STARRS 1 | · | 920 m | MPC · JPL |
| 593972 | 2016 CZ_{343} | — | February 11, 2016 | Haleakala | Pan-STARRS 1 | V | 620 m | MPC · JPL |
| 593973 | 2016 CK_{345} | — | February 10, 2016 | Haleakala | Pan-STARRS 1 | · | 740 m | MPC · JPL |
| 593974 | 2016 CK_{347} | — | February 5, 2016 | Haleakala | Pan-STARRS 1 | · | 960 m | MPC · JPL |
| 593975 | 2016 CP_{348} | — | February 9, 2016 | Haleakala | Pan-STARRS 1 | · | 830 m | MPC · JPL |
| 593976 | 2016 CE_{349} | — | February 4, 2016 | Haleakala | Pan-STARRS 1 | · | 800 m | MPC · JPL |
| 593977 | 2016 DD_{1} | — | February 8, 2011 | Mount Lemmon | Mount Lemmon Survey | · | 1.6 km | MPC · JPL |
| 593978 | 2016 DE_{3} | — | September 25, 2014 | Kitt Peak | Spacewatch | · | 980 m | MPC · JPL |
| 593979 | 2016 DF_{8} | — | March 31, 2009 | Mount Lemmon | Mount Lemmon Survey | · | 950 m | MPC · JPL |
| 593980 | 2016 DZ_{8} | — | January 14, 2016 | Haleakala | Pan-STARRS 1 | · | 940 m | MPC · JPL |
| 593981 | 2016 DB_{13} | — | November 5, 2007 | Mount Lemmon | Mount Lemmon Survey | NYS | 1 km | MPC · JPL |
| 593982 | 2016 DD_{13} | — | November 20, 2007 | Mount Lemmon | Mount Lemmon Survey | · | 1.2 km | MPC · JPL |
| 593983 | 2016 DF_{13} | — | March 13, 2005 | Catalina | CSS | NYS | 1.0 km | MPC · JPL |
| 593984 | 2016 DW_{15} | — | October 26, 2011 | Haleakala | Pan-STARRS 1 | · | 720 m | MPC · JPL |
| 593985 | 2016 DL_{18} | — | February 10, 2016 | Haleakala | Pan-STARRS 1 | · | 770 m | MPC · JPL |
| 593986 | 2016 DS_{23} | — | September 26, 2003 | Apache Point | SDSS Collaboration | · | 840 m | MPC · JPL |
| 593987 | 2016 DV_{23} | — | February 4, 2016 | Haleakala | Pan-STARRS 1 | · | 520 m | MPC · JPL |
| 593988 | 2016 DB_{26} | — | February 5, 2016 | Haleakala | Pan-STARRS 1 | · | 1.1 km | MPC · JPL |
| 593989 | 2016 DN_{26} | — | October 15, 2007 | Kitt Peak | Spacewatch | · | 850 m | MPC · JPL |
| 593990 | 2016 DN_{28} | — | February 1, 2009 | Kitt Peak | Spacewatch | · | 550 m | MPC · JPL |
| 593991 | 2016 DY_{32} | — | July 14, 2013 | Haleakala | Pan-STARRS 1 | · | 940 m | MPC · JPL |
| 593992 | 2016 DV_{34} | — | September 2, 2014 | Haleakala | Pan-STARRS 1 | V | 440 m | MPC · JPL |
| 593993 | 2016 DX_{37} | — | February 27, 2016 | Mount Lemmon | Mount Lemmon Survey | · | 780 m | MPC · JPL |
| 593994 | 2016 DJ_{38} | — | March 16, 2005 | Mount Lemmon | Mount Lemmon Survey | NYS | 810 m | MPC · JPL |
| 593995 | 2016 ED_{8} | — | May 29, 2009 | Mount Lemmon | Mount Lemmon Survey | · | 1.1 km | MPC · JPL |
| 593996 | 2016 EL_{14} | — | October 11, 2010 | Catalina | CSS | PHO | 990 m | MPC · JPL |
| 593997 | 2016 EP_{29} | — | December 24, 2014 | Mount Lemmon | Mount Lemmon Survey | · | 1.1 km | MPC · JPL |
| 593998 | 2016 ER_{30} | — | May 15, 2010 | Kitt Peak | Spacewatch | · | 860 m | MPC · JPL |
| 593999 | 2016 EW_{51} | — | March 4, 2016 | Haleakala | Pan-STARRS 1 | · | 990 m | MPC · JPL |
| 594000 | 2016 EY_{52} | — | April 19, 2009 | Mount Lemmon | Mount Lemmon Survey | PHO | 710 m | MPC · JPL |

back to top

== Meaning of names ==
As minor planet discoveries are confirmed, they are given a permanent number by the IAU's Minor Planet Center (MPC), and the discoverers can then submit names for them, following the IAU's naming conventions. The list below concerns those minor planets in the specified number-range that have received names, and explains the meanings of those names.

Official naming citations of newly named small Solar System bodies are approved and published in a bulletin by IAU's Working Group for Small Bodies Nomenclature (WGSBN). Before May 2021, citations were published in MPC's Minor Planet Circulars for many decades. Recent citations can also be found on the JPL Small-Body Database (SBDB). Until his death in 2016, German astronomer Lutz D. Schmadel compiled these citations into the Dictionary of Minor Planet Names (DMP) and regularly updated the collection.

Based on Paul Herget's The Names of the Minor Planets, Schmadel also researched the unclear origin of numerous asteroids, most of which had been named prior to World War II. This article incorporates text from this source, which is in the public domain: SBDB New namings may only be added to this list below after official publication as the preannouncement of names is condemned. The WGSBN publishes a comprehensive guideline for the naming rules of non-cometary small Solar System bodies.

| Named minor planet | Provisional | This minor planet was named for... | Ref · Catalog |
|---|---|---|---|
| 593195 Lavinaahmed | 2015 HR_{75} | Lavina Ahmed (1983–2020) was a Bangladeshi-Swedish scientist and cancer researcher who focused on the AXL receptor tyrosine kinase. | IAU · 593195 |
