= MACC1, MET transcriptional regulator =

Protein-coding gene in the species Homo sapiens

MACC1

Identifiers
- Aliases: MACC1, 7A5, SH3BP4L, metastasis associated in colon cancer 1, MET transcriptional regulator, MET transcriptional regulator MACC1
- External IDs: OMIM: 612646; MGI: 2685113; GeneCards: MACC1

Gene location (Human)
Chr.	Chromosome 7 (human)
Band	7p21.1	Start	20,134,655 bp
Band	7p21.1	End	20,217,404 bp

Gene location (Mouse)
Chr.	Chromosome 12 (mouse)
Band	12|12 F2	Start	119,278,005 bp
Band	12|12 F2	End	119,433,722 bp
RNA expression pattern
Bgee	Human / Mouse (ortholog); Top expressed in: nasal epithelium; palpebral conjunctiva; mucosa of ileum; islet of Langerhans; bronchial epithelial cell; epithelium of nasopharynx; duodenum; oral cavity; secondary oocyte; epithelium of colon / Top expressed in: epithelium of stomach; transitional epithelium of urinary bladder; hair follicle; conjunctival fornix; skin of external ear; cornea; skin of back; lobe of prostate; skin of abdomen; urethra; More reference expression data
BioGPS	n/a
Gene ontology
Molecular function	growth factor activity; RNA polymerase II transcription regulatory region sequence-specific DNA binding; DNA-binding transcription activator activity, RNA polymerase II-specific
Cellular component	cytoplasm; mitochondrion; nucleus
Biological process	regulation of transcription, DNA-templated; positive regulation of cell division; transcription, DNA-templated; transcription by RNA polymerase II; positive regulation of transcription by RNA polymerase II; regulation of signaling receptor activity; signal transduction
Sources:Amigo / QuickGO
Orthologs
Databases	NCBI: entry; OMA: entry
Species	Human	Mouse
Entrez	346389	238455
Ensembl	ENSG00000183742	ENSMUSG00000041886
UniProt	Q6ZN28	E9PXX8
RefSeq (mRNA)	NM_182762	NM_001163136
RefSeq (protein)	NP_877439	NP_001156608
Location (UCSC)	Chr 7: 20.13 – 20.22 Mb	Chr 12: 119.28 – 119.43 Mb
PubMed search
- Wikidata
View/Edit Human	View/Edit Mouse

MACC1, MET transcriptional regulator is a protein that in humans is encoded by the MACC1 gene.

== Function ==
MACC1 is a key regulator of the hepatocyte growth factor (HGF)-HGF receptor (HGFR) pathway, which is involved in cellular growth, epithelial-mesenchymal transition, angiogenesis, cell motility, invasiveness, and metastasis. Expression of MACC1 in colon cancer specimens is an independent prognostic indicator for metastasis formation and metastasis-free survival.
