= Foretinib =

Names
- Preferred IUPAC name N^{1}-[3-Fluoro-4-({6-methoxy-7-[3-(morpholin-4-yl)propoxy]quinolin-4-yl}oxy)phenyl]-N′^{1}-(4-fluorophenyl)cyclopropane-1,1-dicarboxamide
- Other names XL880; EXEL-2880; GSK1363089; GSK089

Identifiers
CAS Number	849217-64-7
3D model (JSmol)	Interactive image
ChEBI	CHEBI:91418
ChEMBL	ChEMBL1908393
ChemSpider	24608641
DrugBank	DB12307
ECHA InfoCard	100.158.129
KEGG	D09618
PubChem CID	42642645
UNII	81FH7VK1C4
CompTox Dashboard (EPA)	DTXSID20918193
- InChI: Key: CXQHYVUVSFXTMY-UHFFFAOYSA-N; InChI=1S/C34H34F2N4O6/c1-43-30-20-25-27(21-31(30)45-16-2-13-40-14-17-44-18-15-40)37-12-9-28(25)46-29-8-7-24(19-26(29)36)39-33(42)34(10-11-34)32(41)38-23-5-3-22(35)4-6-23/h3-9,12,19-21H,2,10-11,13-18H2,1H3,(H,38,41)(H,39,42)
- SMILES: COc1cc2c(ccnc2cc1OCCCN3CCOCC3)Oc4ccc(cc4F)NC(=O)C5(CC5)C(=O)Nc6ccc(cc6)F

Properties
Chemical formula	C_{34}H_{34}F_{2}N_{4}O_{6}
Molar mass	632.665 g·mol^{−1}
- Except where otherwise noted, data are given for materials in their standard state (at 25 °C [77 °F], 100 kPa). Infobox references

Foretinib is an experimental drug candidate for the treatment of cancer. It was discovered by Exelixis and is under development by GlaxoSmithKline. About 10 Phase II clinical trials have been run. As of October 2015 it appears development has been discontinued.

Foretinib is an inhibitor of the kinase enzymes c-Met and vascular endothelial growth factor receptor 2 (VEGFR-2).

== See also ==
- c-Met inhibitors
- Cabozantinib, a similar molecule and kinase inhibitor with FDA approval
- VEGFR inhibitor
- tyrosine-kinase inhibitor
