= Zanzalintinib =

Drug currently undergoing clinical studies

Clinical data
- Other names: XL092

Legal status
- Legal status: Investigational

Identifiers
- IUPAC name: 1-N′-(4-Fluorophenyl)-1-N-[4-[7-methoxy-6-(methylcarbamoyl)quinolin-4-yl]oxyphenyl]cyclopropane-1,1-dicarboxamide
- CAS Number: 2367004-54-2
- PubChem CID: 139350422
- ChemSpider: 114641993
- UNII: KC2JC2ZA04

Chemical and physical data
- Formula: C_{29}H_{25}FN_{4}O_{5}
- Molar mass: 528.540 g·mol^{−1}
- 3D model (JSmol): Interactive image
- SMILES: CNC(=O)C1=CC2=C(C=CN=C2C=C1OC)OC3=CC=C(C=C3)NC(=O)C4(CC4)C(=O)NC5=CC=C(C=C5)F
- InChI: InChI=1S/C29H25FN4O5/c1-31-26(35)22-15-21-23(16-25(22)38-2)32-14-11-24(21)39-20-9-7-19(8-10-20)34-28(37)29(12-13-29)27(36)33-18-5-3-17(30)4-6-18/h3-11,14-16H,12-13H2,1-2H3,(H,31,35)(H,33,36)(H,34,37); Key:JSPCKALGNNVYOO-UHFFFAOYSA-N

Zanzalintinib (also known as XL092) is an inhibitor of several receptor tyrosine kinases, including VEGFR2, MET, and the TAM kinases AXL and MERTK. It could potentially be used to treat colorectal cancer and renal cell carcinoma (RCC). It is being developed by Exelixis.

STELLAR-303 is a phase 3, randomized trial of zanzalintinib in combination with atezolizumab versus regorafenib in previously treated metastatic colorectal cancer. The trial found that the combination of zanzalintinib and atezolizumab improved overall survival compared to regorafenib.

STELLAR-304 (NCT05678673) is a phase 3, randomized trial of zanzalintinib in combination with nivolumab versus sunitinib in patients with advanced or metastatic non-clear cell renal cell carcinoma (nccRCC).
