= Fosgonimeton =

Chemical compound

Clinical data
- Other names: ATH-1017; ATH1017; NDX-1017; NDX1017

Legal status
- Legal status: Investigational

Identifiers
- IUPAC name: [4-[(2S)-3-[[(2S,3S)-1-[(6-amino-6-oxohexyl)amino]-3-methyl-1-oxopentan-2-yl]amino]-2-(hexanoylamino)-3-oxopropyl]phenyl] dihydrogen phosphate
- CAS Number: 2093305-05-4
- PubChem CID: 156596375
- ChemSpider: 115009339
- UNII: H91OA9858J
- KEGG: D12392
- ChEMBL: ChEMBL5095419

Chemical and physical data
- Formula: C_{27}H_{45}N_{4}O_{8}P
- Molar mass: 584.651 g·mol^{−1}
- 3D model (JSmol): Interactive image
- SMILES: CCCCCC(=O)N[C@@H](CC1=CC=C(C=C1)OP(=O)(O)O)C(=O)N[C@@H]([C@@H](C)CC)C(=O)NCCCCCC(=O)N
- InChI: InChI=1S/C27H45N4O8P/c1-4-6-8-12-24(33)30-22(18-20-13-15-21(16-14-20)39-40(36,37)38)26(34)31-25(19(3)5-2)27(35)29-17-10-7-9-11-23(28)32/h13-16,19,22,25H,4-12,17-18H2,1-3H3,(H2,28,32)(H,29,35)(H,30,33)(H,31,34)(H2,36,37,38)/t19-,22-,25-/m0/s1; Key:MBYDCPOKVKDSFD-JTJYXVOQSA-N

Fosgonimeton (INN; developmental code names ATH-1017 and NDX-1017) is an investigational new drug that is being evaluated to treat neurodegenerative diseases such as Alzheimer's and Parkinson's disease. It is a pro-drug of the active metabolite dihexa. Dihexa in turn binds to the hepatocyte growth factor (HGF) and potentiates its activity at its receptor, c-Met.

== See also ==
- Dihexa
- Brelgometon
