= Brelgometon =

Clinical data
- Other names: ATH-1105; ATH1105
- Drug class: Hepatocyte growth factor (HGF)–c-MET signaling positive modulator; Neuroprotective agent; Anti-inflammatory drug

Identifiers
- IUPAC name: (6S)-6-methyl-8-[(2S)-2-methylbutyl]-1-[[4-(trifluoromethyl)phenyl]methyl]-3,6,9,9a-tetrahydro-2H-pyrazino[1,2-a]pyrimidine-4,7-dione
- PubChem CID: 179075010
- ChemSpider: 138738112
- UNII: WM2SW47S8J

Chemical and physical data
- Formula: C_{21}H_{28}F_{3}N_{3}O_{2}
- Molar mass: 411.469 g·mol^{−1}
- 3D model (JSmol): Interactive image
- SMILES: CC[C@H](C)CN1CC2N(CCC(=O)N2[C@H](C1=O)C)CC3=CC=C(C=C3)C(F)(F)F
- InChI: InChI=1S/C21H28F3N3O2/c1-4-14(2)11-26-13-18-25(10-9-19(28)27(18)15(3)20(26)29)12-16-5-7-17(8-6-16)21(22,23)24/h5-8,14-15,18H,4,9-13H2,1-3H3/t14-,15-,18?/m0/s1; Key:DWLDFDZUDSQLPP-INHRHCAVSA-N

Brelgometon (INN; developmental code name ATH-1105) is a positive modulator of hepatocyte growth factor (HGF)–c-MET signaling which is under development for the treatment of amyotrophic lateral sclerosis (ALS) and frontotemporal dementia (FTD). It is a small-molecule and has favorable drug-like properties, such as oral bioavailability and blood–brain barrier permeabiliy. The drug shows potent neuroprotective and anti-inflammatory effects in preclinical research, including in models of ALS. It was originated by Athira Pharma and is under development by LeonaBio. As of April 2026, the drug is in phase 1 clinical trials for ALS and is in the preclinical research stage of development for FTD. A phase 2 trial for ALS is being planned for the second half of 2026.

== See also ==
- Dihexa
- Fosgonimeton
