= R428 =

R428 could refer to

- the R428 road (Ireland)
- A code name for the Bemcentinib drug candidate
- A 2.8 litre diesel engine in List of Chrysler engines
