= Gumarontinib =

Pharmaceutical drug

Clinical data
- Other names: Glumetinib; SCC244; SC-C244
- Routes of administration: Oral

Legal status
- Legal status: Rx in China

Identifiers
- IUPAC name: 6-(1-Methylpyrazol-4-yl)-1-[6-(1-methylpyrazol-4-yl)imidazo[1,2-a]pyridin-3-yl]sulfonylpyrazolo[4,3-b]pyridine
- CAS Number: 1642581-63-2
- PubChem CID: 117797905
- DrugBank: DB15630
- ChemSpider: 68006902
- UNII: 7JTT036WGX
- ChEMBL: ChEMBL4594400

Chemical and physical data
- Formula: C_{21}H_{17}N_{9}O_{2}S
- Molar mass: 459.49 g·mol^{−1}
- 3D model (JSmol): Interactive image
- SMILES: CN1C=C(C=N1)C2=CN3C(=NC=C3S(=O)(=O)N4C5=C(C=N4)N=CC(=C5)C6=CN(N=C6)C)C=C2
- InChI: InChI=1S/C21H17N9O2S/c1-27-11-16(7-24-27)14-3-4-20-23-10-21(29(20)13-14)33(31,32)30-19-5-15(6-22-18(19)9-26-30)17-8-25-28(2)12-17/h3-13H,1-2H3; Key:RYBLECYFLJXEJX-UHFFFAOYSA-N

Gumarontinib is a pharmaceutical drug used for the treatment of cancer. In China, it was conditionally approved in 2023 for the treatment of adult patients with locally advanced or metastatic non-small cell lung cancer (NSCLC) with MET exon 14 skipping mutation.

Gumarontinib is a selective MET—hepatocyte growth factor receptor—inhibitor.
