= Mir-199 microRNA precursor =

mir-199 microRNA precursor
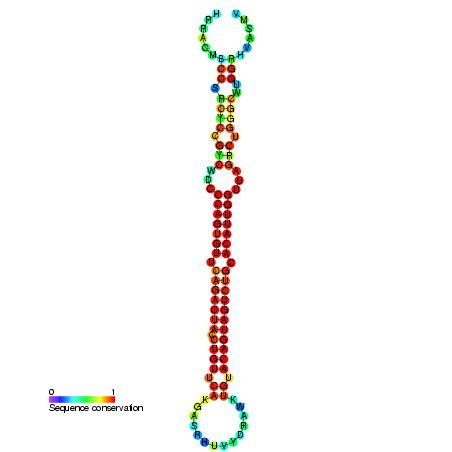
- Predicted secondary structure and sequence conservation of mir-199

Identifiers
- Symbol: mir-199
- Rfam: RF00144
- miRBase: MI0000242
- miRBase family: MIPF0000040

Other data
- RNA type: Gene; miRNA
- Domain(s): Eukaryota
- GO: GO:0035195 GO:0035068
- SO: SO:0001244
- PDB structures: PDBe

The miR-199 microRNA precursor is a short non-coding RNA gene involved in gene regulation. miR-199 genes have now been predicted or experimentally confirmed in mouse, human and a further 21 other species. microRNAs are transcribed as ~70 nucleotide precursors and subsequently processed by the Dicer enzyme to give a ~22 nucleotide product. The mature products are thought to have regulatory roles through complementarity to mRNA.

== Origin and evolution of miR-199 ==
miR-199 has been shown to be a vertebrate specific miR family that emerge at the origin of the vertebrate lineage. Three paralogs of miR-199 can usually be found in non-teleost vertebrate species and 4 to 5 copies in the teleost species. All miR-199 genes are located on opposite strand of orthologous intron of Dynamin genes. Within Dynamin3 gene (Dnm3), miR-199 is associated with miR-214 and both miRs are transcribed together as a common primary transcript, demonstrated in mouse, human and zebrafish.

== Targets and expression of miR-199 ==
miR-199 has been shown to be implicated in a wide variety of cellular and developmental mechanisms such as various cancer development and progression, cardiomyocytes protection or skeletal formation.

Using microarray and immunoblotting analyses it has been shown that miR-199a* targets the Met proto-oncogene.

MicroRNA hsa-miR-199a is a regulator of IκB kinase-β (IKKβ) expression.

Using TaqMan real-time quantitative PCR array methods, miRNA expression has been profiled. miR-199a, one of the most significantly overexpressed in invasive squamous cell carcinomas (ISCCs), was evaluated by transfecting cervical cancer cells (SiHa and ME-180) with anti-miR-199a oligonucleotides and the cell viability assessed. mirR-199a*, mir199a and mirR-199b were significantly overexpressed in ISCCs.

== Implication of miR-199 in skeletogenesis ==
miR-199, along with its cluster mate MiR-214, has been shown to be implicated in skeleton formation. In mice, miR-199 is expressed in perichondrial cells, periarticular chondrocytes, tracheal cartilage, limb mesenchyme, and most tissues in the upper and lower jaw. In zebrafish, miR-199 is expressed in the developing notochord and in all tissues surrounding developing skeletal elements. Comparative miRNA array led to the isolation of several Bone Morphogenic Protein 2 (BMP2)-responsive miRNAs. Among them, miR-199a* is of particular interest, because it was reported to be specifically expressed in the skeletal system and was shown to inhibit chondrogenesis by down-regulation of Smad1, a major regulator of bone and cartilage formation and development. Also, Twist-1, which is a major actor in skeleton formation, regulates miR-199 and miR-214 cluster expression in mouse. Furthermore, miR199-214 cluster deletion in mouse lead to skeletal development abnormalities including craniofacial defects, neural arch and spinous processes malformations, and osteopenia.

== Clinical relevance of miR-199 ==
Alcoholic liver disease is a common medical consequence of long-term excessive alcohol use. Activation of hypoxia-Inducible Factor-1α (HIF-1α) is an indicator of hypoxia. Endothelin-1 (ET-1) is a protein that constricts blood vessels and raises blood pressure. It has been shown that ethanol-induced miR-199 down-regulation may contribute to augmented HIF-1α and ET-1 expression.
