= MiR-214 =

miR-214
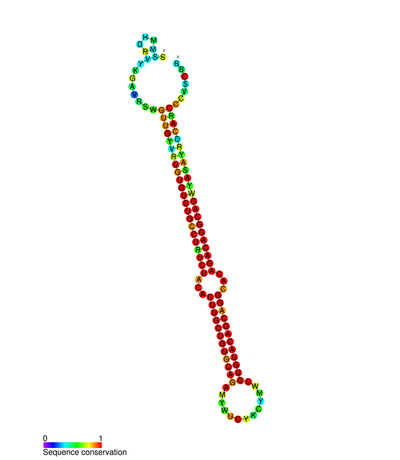
- Conserved secondary structure of miR-214 microRNA precursor

Identifiers
- Symbol: miR-214
- Alt. Symbols: MIR214
- Rfam: RF00660
- miRBase: MI0000290
- miRBase family: MIPF0000062
- NCBI Gene: 406996
- HGNC: 31591
- OMIM: 610721
- RefSeq: NR_029627

Other data
- RNA type: miRNA
- Domain(s): Metazoa
- GO: 0035195
- SO: 0001244
- Locus: Chr. 1 q24.3
- PDB structures: PDBe

miR-214 is a vertebrate-specific family of microRNA precursors. The ~22 nucleotide mature miRNA sequence is excised from the precursor hairpin by the enzyme Dicer. This sequence then associates with RISC which effects RNA interference.

== Origin and evolution of miR-214 ==
miR-214 is a vertebrate-specific miR family that possesses one member in non-teleost vertebrates and two members in teleost fish. miR-214 is likely to have emerged within the Dnm3 gene after the divergence of jawed and jawless vertebrates and is located on the opposite strand of an intron of Dnm3 and is associated in an expression cluster with miR-199.

== Function ==
miR-214 is a "melano-miR", so-called because it is thought to encourage the metastasis of melanoma. Specifically, the mature microRNA excised from miR-214 is predicted to target two activating protein 2 transcription factors, bringing about downstream effects on a number of genes regulating vital cell cycle processes, such as apoptosis, proliferation and angiogenesis.

miR-214 is also thought to regulate type-I collagen.

== Role in cancer ==
miR-214 has been found to be downregulated in human cervical cancer; when miR-214 was upregulated in HeLa cancer cells, it was found to significantly reduce cell growth. Two mRNA targets were identified as those encoding the proteins MAP2K3 and MAPK8.

The increased expression of miR-214 in pancreatic cancer could bring about increased resistance to chemotherapy.

In human glioma cell line T98G expression of miR-214 has been shown to suppress expression of the ubiquitin-conjugating enzyme 9 (UBC9) and reduces tumour cell proliferation. The protein UBC9 is involved in the sumoylation pathway, and is up-regulated in many cancers.

== Implication of miR-214 in skeletogenesis ==
miR-214, along with its cluster mate miR-199, has been shown to be implicated in skeleton formation. miR-214 has been shown to inhibit bone formation in human cell lines both by targeting ATF4, a gene encoding one of the maintranscription factors required for osteoblast function and by suppressing osteogenic differentiation of C2C12 myoblast cells by targeting Sp7, an osteoblast-specific transcription factor. Also, Twist-1, which is a major actor in skeleton formation, regulates miR-199 and miR-214 cluster expression in mouse. Furthermore, miR199-214 cluster deletion in mouse lead to skeletal development abnormalities including craniofacial defects, neural arch and spinous processes malformations, and osteopenia. In zebrafish, miR-214 expression is mainly observed around developing skeletal elements.
