= Ligritinib =

Investigational drug

Clinical data
- Other names: AB-801

Identifiers
- IUPAC name: 6-[(7S)-3-[3-[5-(3-methyl-2-pyridinyl)-2-pyridinyl]-2H-pyrazolo[3,4-b]pyridin-5-yl]-6,7,8,9-tetrahydro-5H-benzo[7]annulen-7-yl]-3-oxa-6-azabicyclo[3.1.1]heptane
- CAS Number: 3024588-48-2
- PubChem CID: 170545987
- IUPHAR/BPS: 14072
- ChemSpider: 133328132
- UNII: 8ZHG636DGC
- ChEMBL: ChEMBL6170680

Chemical and physical data
- Formula: C_{33}H_{32}N_{6}O
- Molar mass: 528.660 g·mol^{−1}
- 3D model (JSmol): Interactive image
- SMILES: CC1=C(N=CC=C1)C2=CN=C(C=C2)C3=C4C=C(C=NC4=NN3)C5=CC6=C(CC[C@@H](CC6)N7C8CC7COC8)C=C5
- InChI: InChI=InChI=1S/C33H32N6O/c1-20-3-2-12-34-31(20)24-8-11-30(35-16-24)32-29-14-25(17-36-33(29)38-37-32)23-5-4-21-6-9-26(10-7-22(21)13-23)39-27-15-28(39)19-40-18-27/h2-5,8,11-14,16-17,26-28H,6-7,9-10,15,18-19H2,1H3,(H,36,37,38)/t26-,27?,28?/m0/s1; Key:IANIKXYKEWAAKX-XWYKLZMASA-N

Ligritinib is an investigational new drug that is being developed by Arcus Biosciences for the treatment of pancreatic adenocarcinoma, cholangiocarcinoma, and other solid tumors. It is an AXL receptor tyrosine kinase inhibitor.
