= George Scangos =

American pharmaceutical executive

George A. Scangos
- Education: Cornell University, University of Massachusetts
- Scientific career
- Fields: Biotechnology
- Workplaces: Johns Hopkins University, Biogen
- Doctoral advisor: Albey Reiner
- Other academic advisors: Frank Ruddle

George A. Scangos was a pharmaceutical executive and former chief executive officer of Vir Biotechnology from 2017 to 2023. Scangos was previously the chief executive officer of Biogen from 2010 to 2016 and of Exelixis from 1996 to 2010. Prior to joining industry, Scangos was a professor of biology at Johns Hopkins University.

== Education ==
He has a BA in biology from Cornell University in 1991. He worked briefly as a lab technician at MIT and then became a sales rep for a lab supply company. Trying to get into a graduate school, he drove out to University of Massachusetts and despite never taking a microbiology course, ended up with a PhD in microbiology from the University of Massachusetts with Albey Reiner in 1977. He then did his postdoctoral fellowship with Frank Ruddle at Yale University where they created the first transgenic mouse.

== Career ==
He was a professor of biology at Johns Hopkins University for six years before taking a sabbatical to join Molecular Diagnostics which was co-founded by Ruddle. Molecular Diagnostics and Molecular Therapeutics were acquired by Bayer and he was recruited to Bayer Biotechnology to expand their labs in 1989. With Bayer, he would lead the development of Factor VIII (medication) at the Berkeley, California campus

In 1996, Scangos joined Exelixis and took the company public and was responsible for building its cancer pipeline and setting up multiple partnerships. Exelixix would move to California and move into small molecule discovery and development. He was named CEO of Biogen Idec during the strategic battle with Carl Icahn and made a number of major changes in the direction of the company including closing down the San Diego site, moving headquarters back to Cambridge and dropping the old Idec name. This also including the pivot from oncology research to risky pipeline projects in neurology and hematology including the development of drugs for multiple sclerosis and Alzheimer's like aducanumab. Scangos was named CEO during the launch of Vir. He would serve as the chair of PhRMA in 2016 and was the lead of the Biotechnology Innovation Organization's response to COVID-19.

== Personal life ==
Scangos grew up in Lynn, Massachusetts and is of Greek descent. His father was an accountant at Exxon. His grandparents came to the US from Greece.
