= Human HGF plasmid DNA therapy =

Human HGF plasmid DNA therapy of cardiomyocytes is being examined as a potential treatment for coronary artery disease (a major cause of myocardial infarction (MI)), as well as treatment for the damage that occurs to the heart after MI. After MI, the myocardium suffers from reperfusion injury which leads to death of cardiomyocytes and detrimental remodelling of the heart, consequently reducing proper cardiac function. Transfection of cardiac myocytes with human HGF reduces ischemic reperfusion injury after MI. The benefits of HGF therapy include preventing improper remodelling of the heart and ameliorating heart dysfunction post-MI.

== Human hepatocyte growth factor ==
Human hepatocyte growth factor (HGF) is an 80kD pleiotropic protein that is endogenously produced by a variety of cell types from the mesenchymal cell lineage (such as cardiomyocytes and neurons). It is produced and proteolytically cleaved to its active state in response to cellular injury or during apoptosis. HGF binds to c-met receptors found on mesenchymal cell types to produce its many different effects such as increased cellular motility, morphogenesis, proliferation and differentiation. Research has shown that HGF has potent angiogenic, anti-fibrotic, and anti-apoptotic properties. It has also been shown to act as a chemoattractant for adult mesenchymal stem cells via c-met receptor binding.

== Research and clinical trials ==
Animal research has demonstrated that administration of HGF cDNA plasmids into ischemic cardiac tissue can increase cardiac function (improved left ventricular ejection fraction and fractional shortening compared to control subjects) after induced MI or ischemia. Transfection with HGF plasmids in damaged cardiac tissue also promotes angiogenesis (increased capillary density compared to control subjects), as well as decreasing detrimental remodelling of the tissue at the site of injury (decreased fibrotic deposition). The increased production of HGF by transfected cardiomyocytes during injury has also shown to be a powerful chemo-attractant of adult mesenchymal stem cells via HGF/c-Met binding. The mitogenic and morphogenic properties of HGF induce recruited stem cells to take on cardiomyocyte phenotypes, potentially helping in the healing of ischemic tissue. The benefits of HGF in experimental models have led to its investigation in clinical trials. A phase I clinical trial entailed injecting an adenovirus vector with the human HGF (Ad-hHGF) gene into the coronary vessels localized to ischemic tissue. Results demonstrate that it is in fact safe to administer the Ad-hHGF vector into patients with coronary artery disease in hopes of re-vascularizing damaged tissue in patients for which coronary artery bypass surgery (CABG) or percutaneous coronary intervention (PCI) are not available or possible. Despite the trial’s limitations (i.e. no assessment of left ventricular function and sample size was quite small), upon follow up assessments at 12 months, none of the patients receiving the treatment had been readmitted to hospital for MI, angina or aggravated heart failure.
