= Tensin-2 =

Protein-coding gene in the species Homo sapiens

TNS2
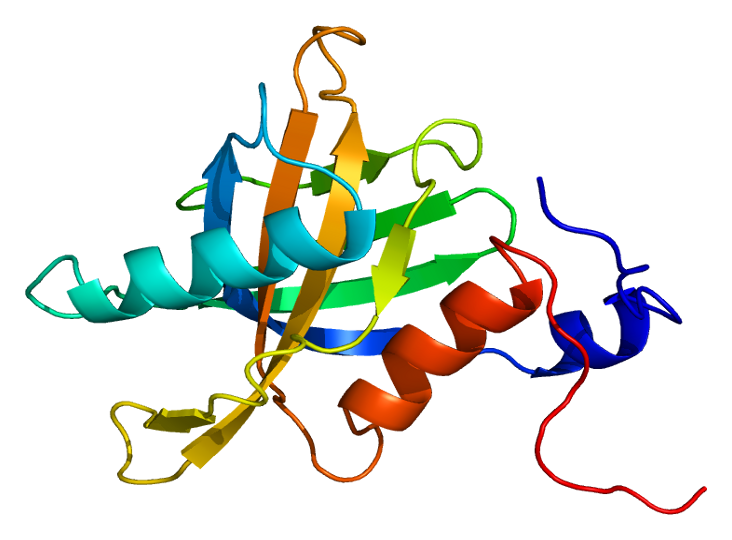

Identifiers
- Aliases: TNS2, C1-TEN, C1TEN, TENC1, tensin 2
- External IDs: OMIM: 607717; MGI: 2387586; GeneCards: TNS2
Available structures
PDB	Ortholog search: PDBe RCSB
PDB	List of PDB id codes 2DKQ, 2KNO, 2L6K, 2LOZ, 3HQC
Enzyme activity
EC #	BRENDA	ExPASy	KEGG	MetaCyc
3.1.3.48	↗	↗	↗	↗

Gene location (Human)
Chr.	Chromosome 12 (human)
Band	12q13.13	Start	53,046,969 bp
Band	12q13.13	End	53,064,379 bp

Gene location (Mouse)
Chr.	Chromosome 15 (mouse)
Band	15 F2|15 57.29 cM	Start	102,008,848 bp
Band	15 F2|15 57.29 cM	End	102,024,836 bp
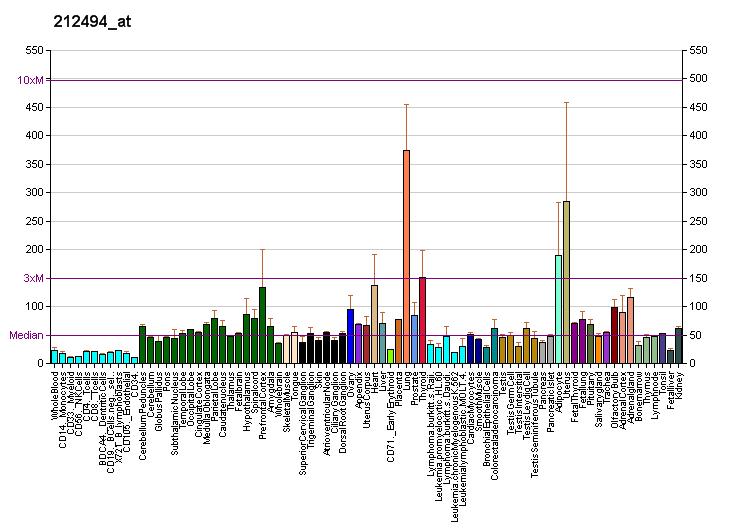
RNA expression pattern
Bgee	Human / Mouse (ortholog); Top expressed in: apex of heart; gastric mucosa; tibial nerve; canal of the cervix; right ovary; left uterine tube; body of uterus; left ovary; right lung; right lobe of thyroid gland / Top expressed in: ankle joint; muscle of thigh; tunica media of zone of aorta; right lung; right lung lobe; lip; brown adipose tissue; myocardium of ventricle; ankle; left lung; More reference expression data
BioGPS	More reference expression data
Gene ontology
Molecular function	kinase binding; phosphoprotein phosphatase activity; protein binding; hydrolase activity; metal ion binding
Cellular component	cell junction; plasma membrane; intracellular anatomical structure; membrane; focal adhesion
Biological process	protein dephosphorylation; collagen metabolic process; intracellular signal transduction; multicellular organismal homeostasis; response to muscle activity; cellular homeostasis; kidney development; negative regulation of cell population proliferation; multicellular organism growth
Sources:Amigo / QuickGO
Orthologs
Databases	NCBI: entry; OMA: entry
Species	Human	Mouse
Entrez	23371	209039
Ensembl	ENSG00000111077	ENSMUSG00000037003
UniProt	Q63HR2	Q8CGB6
RefSeq (mRNA)	NM_015319; NM_170754; NM_198316	NM_153533; NM_001355636
RefSeq (protein)	NP_056134; NP_736610; NP_938072	NP_705761; NP_001342565
Location (UCSC)	Chr 12: 53.05 – 53.06 Mb	Chr 15: 102.01 – 102.02 Mb
PubMed search
- Wikidata
View/Edit Human	View/Edit Mouse

Tensin-2 is an enzyme that in humans is encoded by the TNS2 gene (previously TENC1).

The protein encoded by this gene belongs to the tensin family. Tensin is a focal adhesion molecule that binds to actin filaments and participates in signaling pathways. This protein plays a role in regulating cell migration. Alternative splicing occurs at this locus and three transcript variants encoding three distinct isoforms have been identified.

== Interactions ==
Tensin-2 has been shown to interact with AXL receptor tyrosine kinase.
