= Stelios Papadopoulos =

Greek-born American biophysicist and biotechnology entrepreneur

Stelios Papadopoulos (Greek: Στυλιανός Παπαδόπουλος; born in Thessaloniki, Greece, 1948) is a Greek-born American biophysicist, biotechnology entrepreneur and investment banker. biotechnology entrepreneur and also, investment banker.

== Biography ==
He was born in 1948 in Thessaloniki city, in northern Greece, and grew up in the neighborhood of Charilaou. His family moved to the USA. He earned a master's degree in physics, a PhD in biophysics, and an MBA in finance from the New York University. He has served as a faculty member at this university's Medical School.

He later on entered into the investment banking, and thus worked specifically in biotechnology-focused investment banking at several companies, such as Drexel Burnham Lambert, PaineWebber, and Cowen & Co. Along with others, he co-founded Exelixis, an American biotechnology company, and has served for years as its board chair.

Afterwards, he co-founded Anadys Pharmaceuticals and Cellzome, which were acquired by Hoffmann-La Roche and GlaxoSmithKline, respectively.

Papadopoulos has served as chairman of the board of Biogen in the period of 2014 to 2023. He presently is chairman of Fondation Santé, an organization supporting biomedical research and scientists in Greece and Cyprus.
