= Translocated promoter region =

Protein found in humans

TPR

Identifiers
- Aliases: TPR, translocated promoter region, nuclear basket protein
- External IDs: OMIM: 189940; MGI: 1922066; GeneCards: TPR

Gene location (Human)
Chr.	Chromosome 1 (human)
Band	1q31.1	Start	186,311,652 bp
Band	1q31.1	End	186,375,693 bp

Gene location (Mouse)
Chr.	Chromosome 1 (mouse)
Band	1|1 G1	Start	150,268,589 bp
Band	1|1 G1	End	150,325,686 bp
RNA expression pattern
Bgee	Human / Mouse (ortholog); Top expressed in: tendon of biceps brachii; optic nerve; pylorus; Achilles tendon; lactiferous duct; superficial temporal artery; renal medulla; ventricular zone; pericardium; internal globus pallidus / Top expressed in: genital tubercle; tail of embryo; ventricular zone; Rostral migratory stream; otic placode; saccule; neural layer of retina; epiblast; yolk sac; Gonadal ridge; More reference expression data
BioGPS	n/a
Gene ontology
Molecular function	transporter activity; tubulin binding; structural constituent of nuclear pore; heat shock protein binding; mRNA binding; protein homodimerization activity; chromatin binding; protein binding; dynein complex binding; protein-membrane adaptor activity; mitogen-activated protein kinase binding; RNA binding
Cellular component	cytoplasm; nuclear membrane; nuclear envelope; nuclear periphery; membrane; cytoskeleton; nucleus; kinetochore; nuclear inclusion body; chromosome, centromeric region; spindle; nucleoplasm; chromosome; mitotic spindle; extrinsic component of membrane; nuclear pore; cytoplasmic dynein complex; nuclear pore nuclear basket; host cell
Biological process	positive regulation of mitotic cell cycle spindle assembly checkpoint; nuclear pore complex assembly; protein import into nucleus; RNA export from nucleus; cell cycle; mRNA transport; regulation of protein stability; regulation of protein export from nucleus; viral transcription; RNA import into nucleus; protein sumoylation; positive regulation of protein export from nucleus; mitotic nuclear membrane disassembly; protein export from nucleus; regulation of protein import into nucleus; protein transport; positive regulation of protein import into nucleus; viral process; negative regulation of RNA export from nucleus; nuclear pore organization; mRNA export from nucleus in response to heat stress; positive regulation of intracellular protein transport; negative regulation of transcription by RNA polymerase II; regulation of mitotic sister chromatid separation; mitotic spindle assembly checkpoint signaling; response to epidermal growth factor; cellular response to interferon-alpha; negative regulation of translational initiation; regulation of mRNA export from nucleus; positive regulation of heterochromatin assembly; regulation of mitotic spindle assembly; cell division; regulation of cellular response to heat; nuclear matrix organization; intracellular transport of virus; mRNA export from nucleus; tRNA export from nucleus; cellular response to heat; regulation of gene silencing by miRNA; regulation of glycolytic process; transport; regulation of protein localization
Sources:Amigo / QuickGO
Orthologs
Databases	NCBI: entry; OMA: entry
Species	Human	Mouse
Entrez	7175	108989
Ensembl	ENSG00000047410	ENSMUSG00000006005
UniProt	P12270; Q5SWX9	F6ZDS4
RefSeq (mRNA)	NM_003292	NM_133780
RefSeq (protein)	NP_003283	NP_598541
Location (UCSC)	Chr 1: 186.31 – 186.38 Mb	Chr 1: 150.27 – 150.33 Mb
PubMed search
- Wikidata
View/Edit Human	View/Edit Mouse

translocated promoter region (to activated MET oncogene)

Identifiers
- Symbol: TPR
- NCBI gene: 7175
- HGNC: 12017
- OMIM: 189940
- RefSeq: NM_003292
- UniProt: P12270

Other data
- Locus: Chr. 1 q25
Search for
- Structures: Swiss-model
- Domains: InterPro

Translocated promoter region is a component of the tpr-met fusion protein.
