= Esaxerenone =

Chemical compound

Clinical data
- Trade names: Minnebro
- Other names: CS-3150; XL-550
- Routes of administration: By mouth
- Drug class: Antimineralocorticoid

Identifiers
- IUPAC name: (5P)-1-(2-hydroxyethyl)-N-[4-(methanesulfonyl)phenyl]-4-methyl-5-[2-(trifluoromethyl)phenyl]-1H-pyrrole-3-carboxamide
- CAS Number: 1632006-28-0
- PubChem CID: 25052023
- ChemSpider: 28666733
- UNII: N62TGJ04A1
- KEGG: D10892
- ChEMBL: ChEMBL2181932
- CompTox Dashboard (EPA): DTXSID601336896

Chemical and physical data
- Formula: C_{22}H_{21}F_{3}N_{2}O_{4}S
- Molar mass: 466.48 g·mol^{−1}
- 3D model (JSmol): Interactive image
- SMILES: CC1=C(N(C=C1C(=O)NC2=CC=C(C=C2)S(=O)(=O)C)CCO)C3=CC=CC=C3C(F)(F)F
- InChI: InChI=1S/C22H21F3N2O4S/c1-14-18(21(29)26-15-7-9-16(10-8-15)32(2,30)31)13-27(11-12-28)20(14)17-5-3-4-6-19(17)22(23,24)25/h3-10,13,28H,11-12H2,1-2H3,(H,26,29); Key:NOSNHVJANRODGR-UHFFFAOYSA-N

Esaxerenone (INN; brand name Minnebro; developmental codesCS-3150 and XL-550) is a nonsteroidal antimineralocorticoid which was discovered by Exelixis and developed by Daiichi Sankyo Company. It is approved in Japan for the treatment of hypertension. It acts as a highly selective silent antagonist of the mineralocorticoid receptor (MR), the receptor for aldosterone, with greater than 1,000-fold selectivity for this receptor over other steroid hormone receptors, and 4-fold and 76-fold higher affinity for the MR relative to the existing antimineralocorticoids spironolactone and eplerenone.

Daiichi Sankyo Company on January 8, 2019 announced the receipt of marketing approval in Japan for Minnebro tablets (1.25 mg, 2.5 mg, and 5 mg) for the treatment of hypertension. As of January 2019, esaxerenone is in phase III clinical trials for diabetic nephropathies.

== See also ==
- Apararenone
- Finerenone
