= Tpr-met fusion protein =

Tpr-Met fusion protein is an oncogene fusion protein consisting of TPR and MET.

== Structure ==
Tpr-Met was generated following a chromosomal rearrangement induced by the treatment of a human osteogenic sarcoma cell line with the carcinogen N-methyl-N'-nitronitrosoguanidine. The genomic rearrangement fuses two genetic loci, translocated promoter region, from chromosome 1q25 which encodes a dimerization leucine zipper motif, and MET, from chromosome 7q31 which contributes the kinase domain and carboxy-terminus of the Met RTK. The resulting 65 kDa cytoplasmic Tpr-Met oncoprotein forms a dimer mediated through the Tpr leucine zipper.

The Tpr-Met fusion protein lacks the extracellular, transmembrane and juxtamembrane domains of c-Met receptor, and has gained the Tpr dimerization motif, which allows constitutive and ligand-independent activation of the kinase. The loss of juxtamembrane sequences, necessary for the negative regulation of kinase activity and receptor degradation, prolongs duration of Met signalling.

== Experimental evidences ==
=== Effects in muscle ===
==== Skeletal muscle ====
Specific expression of Tpr-Met in terminally-differentiated skeletal muscle causes muscle wasting in vivo and exerts anti-differentiation effects in terminally differentiated myotubes. Constitutive activation of MET signaling has been suggested to cause defects in myogenic differentiation, contributing to rhabdomyosarcoma development and progression.

==== Cardiac muscle ====
In a transgenic model, cardiac-specific expression of Tpr-Met oncogene during postnatal life causes heart failure with early-onset.
