= Apararenone =

Nonsteroidal antimineralocorticoid

Clinical data
- Other names: MT-3995
- Routes of administration: Oral
- Drug class: Antimineralocorticoid

Identifiers
- IUPAC name: N-[4-(4-fluorophenyl)-2,2-dimethyl-3-oxo-1,4-benzoxazin-7-yl]methanesulfonamide
- CAS Number: 945966-46-1
- PubChem CID: 24744336
- ChemSpider: 28663572
- UNII: 832663U2NB
- ChEMBL: ChEMBL2181929

Chemical and physical data
- Formula: C_{17}H_{17}FN_{2}O_{4}S
- Molar mass: 364.39 g·mol^{−1}
- 3D model (JSmol): Interactive image
- SMILES: CC1(C(=O)N(C2=C(O1)C=C(C=C2)NS(=O)(=O)C)C3=CC=C(C=C3)F)C
- InChI: InChI=1S/C17H17FN2O4S/c1-17(2)16(21)20(13-7-4-11(18)5-8-13)14-9-6-12(10-15(14)24-17)19-25(3,22)23/h4-10,19H,1-3H3; Key:AZNHWXAFPBYFGH-UHFFFAOYSA-N

Apararenone (INN; development code MT-3995) is a nonsteroidal antimineralocorticoid which is under development by Mitsubishi Tanabe Pharma for the treatment of diabetic nephropathies and non-alcoholic steatohepatitis. It was also previously being developed for the treatment of hypertension, but development was discontinued for this indication. Apararenone acts as a highly selective antagonist of the mineralocorticoid receptor (K_{i} < 50 nM), the receptor for aldosterone. As of 2017, it is in phase II clinical trials.

== See also ==
- Esaxerenone
- Finerenone
