= Dihexa =

Chemical compound

Clinical data
- Other names: PNB-0408; PNB0408; N-(1-Oxohexyl)-l-tyrosyl-N-(6-amino-6-oxohexyl)-l-isoleucinamide

Identifiers
- IUPAC name: 6-[(2S,3S)-2-[(2S)-2-hexanamido-3-(4-hydroxyphenyl)propanamido]-3-methylpentanamido]hexanamide
- CAS Number: 1401708-83-5
- PubChem CID: 129010512
- ChemSpider: 57582587
- UNII: 9WYX65A5C2

Chemical and physical data
- Formula: C_{27}H_{44}N_{4}O_{5}
- Molar mass: 504.672 g·mol^{−1}
- 3D model (JSmol): Interactive image
- SMILES: CCCCCC(=O)N[C@@H](Cc1ccc(O)cc1)C(=O)N[C@@H]([C@@H](C)CC)C(=O)NCCCCCC(N)=O
- InChI: InChI=1S/C27H44N4O5/c1-4-6-8-12-24(34)30-22(18-20-13-15-21(32)16-14-20)26(35)31-25(19(3)5-2)27(36)29-17-10-7-9-11-23(28)33/h13-16,19,22,25,32H,4-12,17-18H2,1-3H3,(H2,28,33)(H,29,36)(H,30,34)(H,31,35)/t19-,22-,25-/m0/s1; Key:XEUVNVNAVKZSPT-JTJYXVOQSA-N

Dihexa (developmental code PNB-0408; also known as N-hexanoic-Tyr-Ile-(6) aminohexanoic amide) is an oligopeptide drug derived from angiotensin IV that binds with high affinity to hepatocyte growth factor (HGF) and potentiates its activity at its receptor, c-Met. The compound has been found to potently improve cognitive function in animal models of Alzheimer's disease-like mental impairment. In an assay of neurotrophic activity, dihexa was found to be seven orders of magnitude more potent than brain-derived neurotrophic factor (BDNF).

According to a patent, "Short duration safety studies with dihexa have uncovered no apparent toxicity. Of particular note is a lack of neoplastic induction, since c-Met is recognized as an oncogene. This is unsurprising since oncogenesis requires multiple mutations including both oncogene induction and tumor suppressor attenuation."

== History ==
Dihexa was developed by Joseph Harding and his team at Washington State University. Later developments were done by M3 Biotechnology, a company founded to commercialize dihexa.

Fosgonimeton, a phosphate pro-drug of dihexa is currently in clinical trials for the treatment of neurodegenerative diseases such as Alzheimer's and Parkinson's diseases.

== See also ==
- Fosgonimeton
- Brelgometon
