= Tivantinib =

Chemical compound

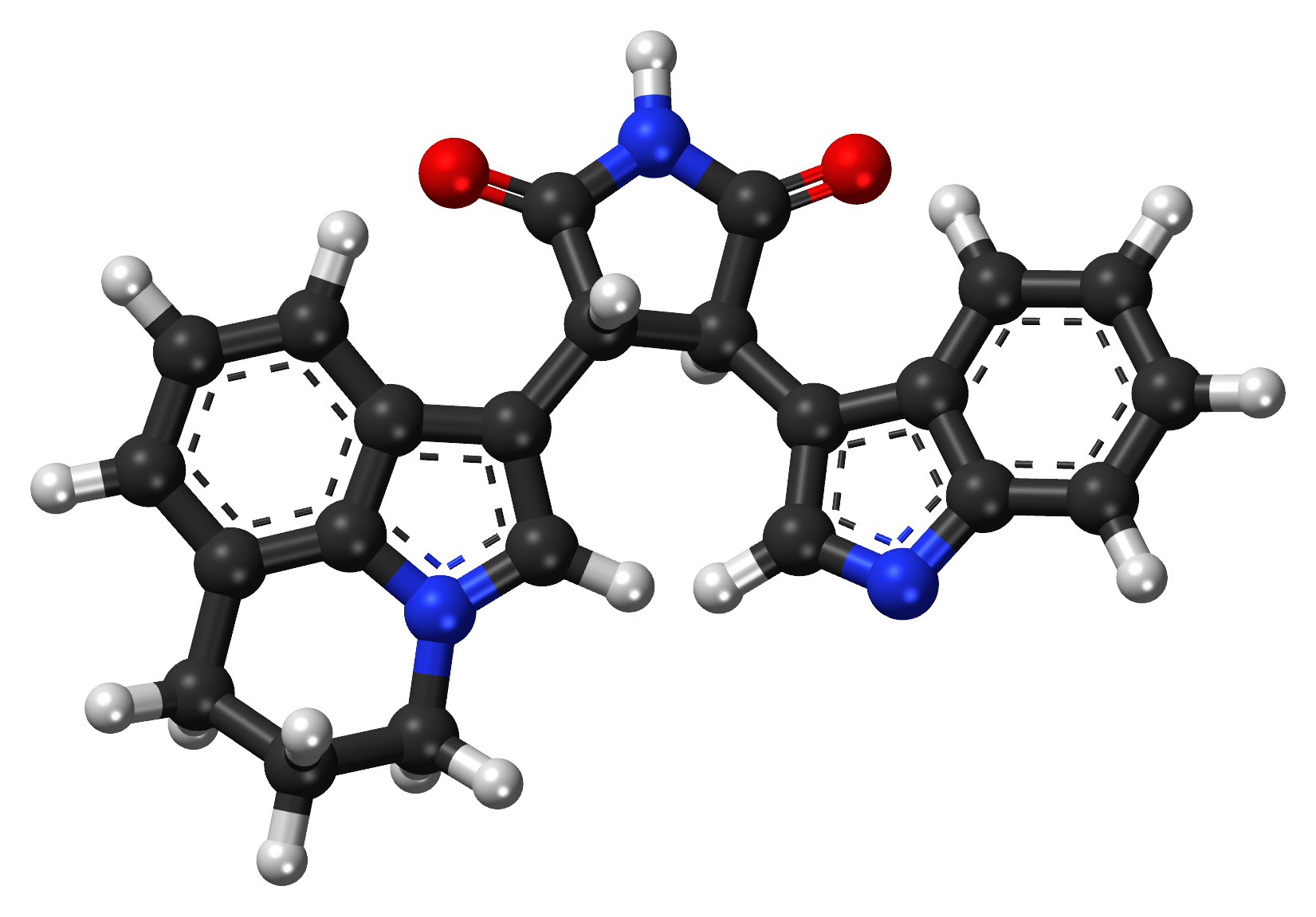

Clinical data
- Other names: ARQ197; ARQ-197
- Routes of administration: Oral
- ATC code: none

Legal status
- Legal status: Investigational

Identifiers
- IUPAC name: (3R,4R)-3-(5,6-Dihydro-4H-pyrrolo[3,2,1-ij]quinolin-1-yl)-4-(1H-indol-3-yl)-2,5-pyrrolidinedione
- CAS Number: 905854-02-6
- PubChem CID: 11494412
- ChemSpider: 9669218
- UNII: PJ4H73IL17
- KEGG: D10173
- ChEMBL: ChEMBL2103882
- CompTox Dashboard (EPA): DTXSID60920316
- ECHA InfoCard: 100.231.891

Chemical and physical data
- Formula: C_{23}H_{19}N_{3}O_{2}
- Molar mass: 369.424 g·mol^{−1}
- 3D model (JSmol): Interactive image
- SMILES: C1CC2=C3C(=CC=C2)C(=CN3C1)[C@H]4[C@@H](C(=O)NC4=O)C5=CNC6=CC=CC=C65
- InChI: InChI=1S/C23H19N3O2/c27-22-19(16-11-24-18-9-2-1-7-14(16)18)20(23(28)25-22)17-12-26-10-4-6-13-5-3-8-15(17)21(13)26/h1-3,5,7-9,11-12,19-20,24H,4,6,10H2, (H,25,27,28)/t19-,20-/m0/s1; Key:UCEQXRCJXIVODC-PMACEKPBSA-N

Tivantinib (ARQ197; by Arqule, Inc.) is an experimental small molecule anti-cancer drug. It is a bisindolylmaleimide that binds to the dephosphorylated MET kinase in vitro. (MET is a growth factor receptor.) Tivantinib is being tested clinically as a highly selective MET inhibitor. However, the mechanism of action of tivantinib is still unclear.

Tivantinib displays cytotoxic activity via molecular mechanisms that are independent from its ability to bind MET, notably tubulin binding, which likely underlies tivantinib cytotoxicity.

Possible applications include non-small-cell lung carcinoma, hepatocellular carcinoma, and oesophageal cancer.

In 2017, it was announced that a phase III clinical trial for advanced hepatocellular carcinoma had failed to meet the primary endpoint.

== See also ==
- Template:Intracellular chemotherapeutic agents
- Template:Growth factor receptor modulators
