= Endogenous cardiac stem cell =

Stem cells in the adult heart

Endogenous cardiac stem cells (eCSCs) are tissue-specific stem progenitor cells harboured within the adult mammalian heart. A scientific-misconduct scandal, involving Harvard professor Piero Anversa, might indicate that the heart stem cell concept be broken. Therefore, the following article should be read with caution, as it builds on Anversa's results.

Endogenous cardiac stem cells were first discovered in 2003 by Bernardo Nadal-Ginard, Piero Anversa and colleagues in the adult rat heart and since then have been identified and isolated from mouse, dog, porcine and human hearts.

The adult heart was previously thought to be a post mitotic organ without any regenerative capability. The identification of eCSCs has provided an explanation for the hitherto unexplained existence of a subpopulation of immature cycling myocytes in the adult myocardium. Indeed, recent evidence from a genetic fate-mapping study established that stem cells replenish adult mammalian cardiomyocytes lost by cardiac wear and tear and injury throughout the adult life. Moreover, it is now accepted that myocyte death and myocyte renewal are the two sides of the proverbial coin of cardiac homeostasis in which the eCSCs play a central role. These findings produced a paradigm shift in cardiac biology and opened new opportunities and approaches for future treatment of cardiac diseases by placing the heart squarely amongst other organs with regenerative potential such as the liver, skin, muscle, CNS. However, they have not changed the well-established fact that the working myocardium is mainly constituted of terminally differentiated contractile myocytes. This fact does not exclude, but is it fully compatible with the heart being endowed with a robust intrinsic regenerative capacity which resides in the presence of the eCSCs throughout the individual lifespan.

Briefly, eCSCs have been first identified through the expression of c-kit, the receptor of the stem cell factor and the absence of common hematopoietic markers, like CD45. Afterwards, different membrane markers (Sca-1, Abcg-2, Flk-1) and transcription factors (Isl-1, Nkx2.5, GATA4) have been employed to identify and characterize these cells in the embryonic and adult life. eCSCs are clonogenic, self-renewing and multipotent in vitro and in vivo, capable of generating the 3 major cell types of the myocardium: myocytes, smooth muscle and endothelial vascular cells. They express several markers of stemness (i.e. Oct3/4, Bmi-1, Nanog) and have significant regenerative potential in vivo. When cloned in suspension they form cardiospheres, which when cultured in a myogenic differentiation medium, attach and differentiate into beating cardiomyocytes.

In 2012, it was proposed that Isl-1 is not a marker for endogenous cardiac stem cells. That same year, a different group demonstrated that Isl-1 is not restricted to second heart field progenitors in the developing heart, but also labels cardiac neural crest. It has also been reported that Flk-1 is not a specific marker for endogenous and mouse ESC-derived Isl1+ CPCs. While some eCSC discoveries have been brought into question, there has been success with other membrane markers. For instance, it was demonstrated that the combination of Flt1+/Flt4+ membrane markers identifies an Isl1+/Nkx2.5+ cell population in the developing heart. It was also shown that endogenous Flt1+/Flt4+ cells could be expanded in vitro and displayed trilineage differentiation potential. Flt1+/Flt4+ CPCs derived from iPSCs were shown to engraft into the adult myocardium and robustly differentiate into cardiomyocytes with phenotypic and electrophysiologic characteristics of adult cardiomyocytes.

With the myocardium now recognized as a tissue with limited regenerating potential, harbouring eCSCs that can be isolated and amplified in vitro for regenerative protocols of cell transplantation or stimulated to replicate and differentiate in situ in response to growth factors, it has become reasonable to exploit this endogenous regenerative potential to replace lost/damaged cardiac muscle with autologous functional myocardium.
