= Bemcentinib =

Chemical compound

Clinical data
- Other names: BGB324; R428

Legal status
- Legal status: Investigational

Identifiers
- IUPAC name: 1-(6,7-Dihydro-5H-benzo[2,3]cyclohepta[2,4-d]pyridazin-3-yl)-3-N-[(7S)-7-pyrrolidin-1-yl-6,7,8,9-tetrahydro-5H-benzo[7]annulen-3-yl]-1,2,4-triazole-3,5-diamine
- CAS Number: 1037624-75-1
- PubChem CID: 46215462
- IUPHAR/BPS: 10478
- DrugBank: DB12411
- ChemSpider: 30648145
- UNII: 0ICW2LX8AS
- KEGG: D11438
- ChEMBL: ChEMBL3809489
- CompTox Dashboard (EPA): DTXSID70673109

Chemical and physical data
- Formula: C_{30}H_{34}N_{8}
- Molar mass: 506.658 g·mol^{−1}
- 3D model (JSmol): Interactive image
- SMILES: Nc1nc(Nc2ccc3c(c2)CC[C@H](N2CCCC2)CC3)nn1-c1cc2c(nn1)-c1ccccc1CCC2
- InChI: InChI=1S/C30H34N8/c31-29-33-30(32-24-13-10-20-11-14-25(15-12-22(20)18-24)37-16-3-4-17-37)36-38(29)27-19-23-8-5-7-21-6-1-2-9-26(21)28(23)35-34-27/h1-2,6,9-10,13,18-19,25H,3-5,7-8,11-12,14-17H2,(H3,31,32,33,36)/t25-/m1/s1; Key:KXMZDGSRSGHMMK-RUZDIDTESA-N

Bemcentinib, also known as BGB324 or R428, is an experimental oral small molecule that is an inhibitor of AXL kinase. Bemcentinib was licensed from Rigel Pharmaceuticals by BerGenBio and currently undergoing six Phase II trials in various solid and hematological tumors as monotherapy and in combination with immunotherapy, chemotherapy, and targeted therapeutics.

== Function ==
Bemcentinib targets and binds to the intracellular catalytic kinase domain of AXL receptor tyrosine kinase and inhibits its activity. Increase in AXL function has been linked to key mechanisms of drug resistance and immune escape by tumor cells, leading to aggressive metastatic cancers. In addition, BGB324 enhances sensitivity to various therapies including chemotherapy, immunotherapy and several targeted therapeutics.

== Clinical trials ==
Bemcentinib is currently undergoing Phase II clinical trials for non-small-cell lung cancer (NSCLC), triple-negative breast cancer (TNBC), acute myeloid leukemia /myelodysplastic syndrome (AML/MDS), melanoma and metastatic pancreatic cancer.

=== COVID-19 ===
In April 2020 Bemcentinib became the first candidate to be selected as part of the UK Government's ACCORD (Accelerating COVID-19 Research & Development) for Phase II clinical trial in patients with COVID-19.
