= AXL receptor tyrosine kinase =

Protein-coding gene in the species Homo sapiens

AXL
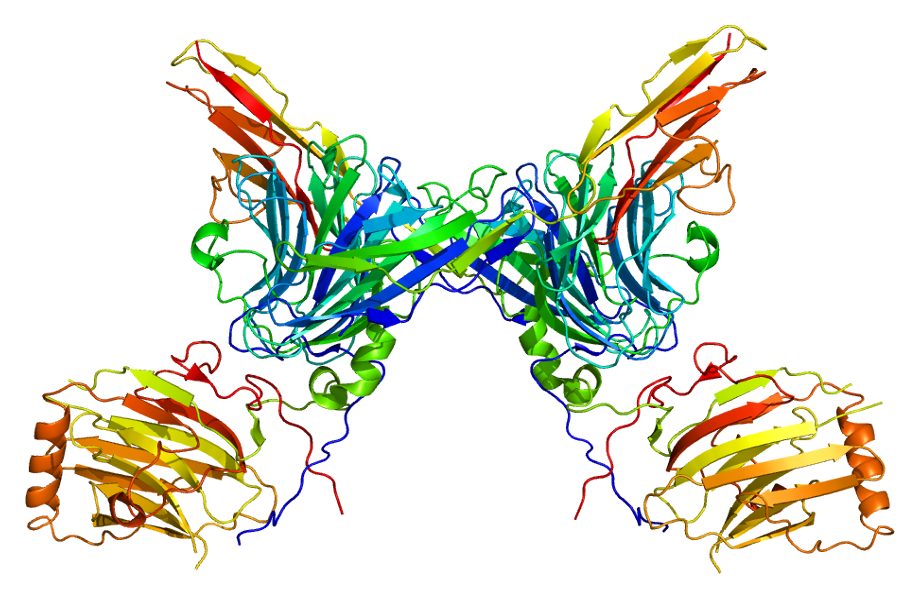

Identifiers
- Aliases: AXL, AZF, AZFA, SP3, AZF1, ARK, JTK11, Tyro7, UFO, AXL receptor tyrosine kinase
- External IDs: OMIM: 109135; MGI: 1347244; GeneCards: AXL
Available structures
| PDB | Ortholog search: PDBe RCSB |
| PDB | List of PDB id codes 2C5D, 4RA0 |
Enzyme activity
| EC # | BRENDA | ExPASy | KEGG | MetaCyc |
|---|---|---|---|---|
| 2.7.10.1 | ↗ | ↗ | ↗ | ↗ |

Gene location (Human)
| Chr. | Chromosome 19 (human) |
| Band | 19q13.2 | Start | 41,219,223 bp |
| Band | 19q13.2 | End | 41,261,766 bp |

Gene location (Mouse)
| Chr. | Chromosome 7 (mouse) |
| Band | 7 A3|7 14.02 cM | Start | 25,456,698 bp |
| Band | 7 A3|7 14.02 cM | End | 25,488,130 bp |
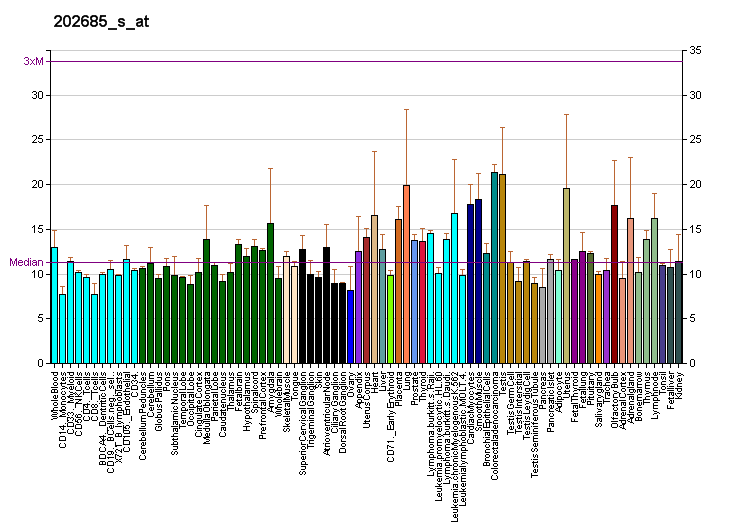

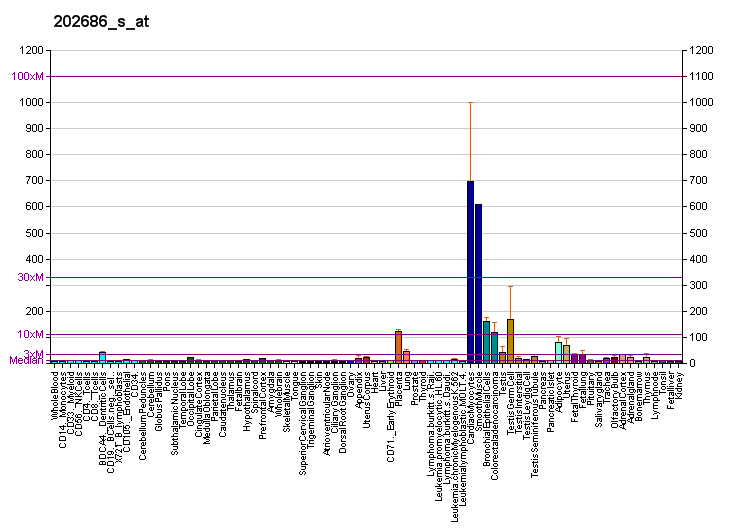
RNA expression pattern
| Bgee | Human / Mouse (ortholog); Top expressed in: synovial joint; saphenous vein; stromal cell of endometrium; cartilage tissue; synovial membrane; urethra; pericardium; decidua; popliteal artery; tibial arteries / Top expressed in: Gonadal ridge; ascending aorta; aortic valve; umbilical cord; ankle joint; lip; ankle; efferent ductule; stroma of bone marrow; uterus; More reference expression data |
| BioGPS | More reference expression data |
Gene ontology
| Molecular function | nucleotide binding; protein kinase activity; transferase activity; virus receptor activity; kinase activity; protein heterodimerization activity; ATP binding; phosphatidylserine binding; protein binding; transmembrane receptor protein tyrosine kinase activity; phosphatidylinositol 3-kinase binding; myosin heavy chain binding; protein tyrosine kinase activity; Wnt-protein binding |
| Cellular component | extracellular exosome; integral component of membrane; host cell surface; integral component of plasma membrane; cell surface; membrane; intracellular anatomical structure; plasma membrane; extracellular space; receptor complex |
| Biological process | protein kinase B signaling; positive regulation of natural killer cell differentiation; apoptotic cell clearance; negative regulation of lymphocyte activation; spermatogenesis; negative regulation of apoptotic process; signal transduction; natural killer cell differentiation; negative regulation of interferon-gamma production; cellular response to lipopolysaccharide; secretion by cell; vascular endothelial growth factor receptor signaling pathway; substrate adhesion-dependent cell spreading; erythrocyte homeostasis; negative regulation of tumor necrosis factor production; positive regulation of protein kinase B signaling; viral process; positive regulation of cytokine-mediated signaling pathway; cellular response to interferon-alpha; forebrain cell migration; viral entry into host cell; negative regulation of dendritic cell apoptotic process; protein phosphorylation; cellular response to extracellular stimulus; enzyme linked receptor protein signaling pathway; positive regulation of pinocytosis; negative regulation of neuron apoptotic process; vagina development; ovarian cycle; innate immune response; blood vessel remodeling; cell maturation; dendritic cell differentiation; platelet activation; cell differentiation; immune system process; inflammatory response; neuron migration; phosphorylation; cellular response to hydrogen peroxide; animal organ regeneration; phagocytosis; peptidyl-tyrosine phosphorylation; negative regulation of cytokine production; neutrophil clearance; transmembrane receptor protein tyrosine kinase signaling pathway; nervous system development; Wnt signaling pathway; cell migration |
Sources:Amigo / QuickGO
Orthologs
| Databases | NCBI: entry; OMA: entry |
| Species | Human | Mouse |
| Entrez | 558 | 26362 |
| Ensembl | ENSG00000167601 | ENSMUSG00000002602 |
| UniProt | P30530 | Q00993 |
| RefSeq (mRNA) | NM_001278599; NM_001699; NM_021913 | NM_001190974; NM_001190975; NM_009465 |
| RefSeq (protein) | NP_001265528; NP_001690; NP_068713 | NP_001177903; NP_001177904; NP_033491 |
| Location (UCSC) | Chr 19: 41.22 – 41.26 Mb | Chr 7: 25.46 – 25.49 Mb |
| PubMed search |
- Wikidata
| View/Edit Human | View/Edit Mouse |

Tyrosine-protein kinase receptor UFO is a protein that in human is encoded by the AXL gene. The gene was initially designated as UFO, in allusion to the unidentified function of this protein. However, in the years since its discovery, research into AXL's expression profile and mechanism has made it an increasingly attractive target, especially for cancer therapeutics. In recent years, AXL has emerged as a key facilitator of immune escape and drug-resistance by cancer cells, leading to aggressive and metastatic cancers.

AXL is a cell surface receptor tyrosine kinase, part of the TAM family of kinases including TYRO3 and MERTK.

== Gene ==
The Axl gene is evolutionarily conserved between vertebrate species.

Human AXL is in close vicinity to the BCL3 oncogene, which is at 19q13.1-q13.2. This gene has two different alternatively spliced transcript variants.

== Structure ==
The protein encoded by this gene is a member of the receptor tyrosine kinase subfamily. Although it is similar to other receptor tyrosine kinases, the Axl protein represents a unique structure of the extracellular region that juxtaposes IgL and FNIII repeats.

The AXL protein is characterized by an extracellular structure consisting of two fibronectin type 3-like repeats and two immunoglobulin-like repeats along with its intracellular tyrosine kinase domain.

== Function ==
The AXL receptor transduces signals from the extracellular matrix into the cytoplasm by binding growth factors like vitamin K-dependant protein growth-arrest-specific gene 6 (GAS6). It is involved in the stimulation of cell proliferation, migration, differentiation and survival. Activation of Axl leads to autophosphorylation of its intracellular domain. Proteolytic cleavage of the AXL extracellular domain by the metalloproteinases ADAM10 and ADAM17 can downregulate this signalling activity.

Signalling pathways activated downstream of AXL include PI3K-AKT-mTOR, MEKERK, NF-κB, and JAK/STAT.

This receptor can also mediate cell aggregation by homophilic binding.

AXL protein is expressed in normal tissues, particularly in bone marrow stroma and myeloid cells, and in tumour cells and tumour vasculature. In cancer, AXL is expressed on the tumor cells as well as adjacent immune cells including dendritic cells, macrophages, and NK cells.

Axl is an inhibitor of the innate immune response. The function of activated AXL in normal tissues includes the efficient clearance of apoptotic material and the dampening of TLR-dependent inflammatory responses and natural killer cell activity.

Axl expression on dendritic cells has been shown to limit their maturation and functions by limiting cholesterol mobilization for the assembly of lipid nanodomains at the cell surface.

AXL is a putative driver of diverse cellular processes that are critical for the development, growth, and spread of tumours, including proliferation, invasiveness and migration, epithelial-to-mesenchymal transition, stemness, angiogenesis, and immune modulation. AXL has been implicated as a cancer driver and correlated with poor survival in numerous aggressive tumors including triple-negative breast cancer (TNBC), acute myeloid leukemia (AML), non-small-cell lung cancer (NSCLC), pancreatic cancer and ovarian cancer, among others.

== Clinical significance ==
Axl was first isolated in 1988 and identified as an oncogene in a screen for transforming genes in patients with a chronic myelogenous leukemia- that progressed to 'blast crisis'. Since then, increased AXL expression has been associated with numerous cancers including lung cancer, breast cancer, pancreatic cancer, ovarian cancer, colon cancer and melanoma among others, and shown to have a strong correlation with poor survival outcomes.

AXL has been shown to be a key driver of drug-resistance to targeted therapies, immuno therapies and chemotherapy in various animal models. Based on current knowledge of AXL's role in therapy resistance, future studies will help to determine whether AXL has a translational application as a biomarker for predicting therapeutic response to established drugs.

Recently, AXL has been implicated in chronic fibrotic diseases in several organs, including the liver.

AXL also play an important role in Zika virus and SARS-CoV-2 infection, allowing for entry of the virus into host cells. This phenomenon is known to rely on phosphatidylserine incorporated in the viral envelope during egress, which then binds to AXL via the adapter GAS6. AXL mediates internalization into the endosome from which these viruses escape and initiate replication.

== As a drug target ==
Studies have shown that AXL knockdown leads to downregulation of transcription factors required for EMT, including Slug, Twist, and Zeb1, and to increased expression of E-cadherin.

=== Cancer ===
Several drugs classified as "AXL inhibitors" have entered clinical trials; however, many target multiple kinase receptors in addition to AXL. The most advanced AXL selective inhibitor is bemcentinib (BGB324 or R428), an oral small molecule currently in multiple Phase II clinical trials for NSCLC, TNBC, AML and melanoma. Bemcentinib is being pursued as monotherapy and as combination therapy with existing and emerging targeted therapies, immunotherapies and chemotherapy.

A monoclonal antibody targeting AXL (YW327.6S2) and an AXL decoy receptor (GL2I.T) are currently in preclinical development. Additionally, an oral AXL inhibitor (TP-0903) is expected to enter Phase 1 clinical trial in November 2016 (in advanced solid tumours: NCT02729298).

Astellas Pharma is currently testing gilteritinib (ASP2215), a dual FLT3-AXL tyrosine kinase inhibitor in acute myeloid leukemia (AML). In 2017, gilteritinib gained FDA orphan drug status for AML.

Exelixis is developing zanzalintinib, an inhibitor of several receptor tyrosine kinases, including VEGFR2, MET, AXL, and MERTK. There have phase 3 trials have been conducted in metastatic colorectal cancer and non-clear-cell RCC.

These drugs with ongoing and pending clinical trials highlight the potential safety and efficacy of AXL inhibition.

In addition, ligritinib, is being developed as AXL targeted drugs.

== Interactions ==
AXL receptor tyrosine kinase has been shown to interact with TENC1. Also, it interacts with CBL, GRB2, LCK, NCK2, PIK3R1, PIK3R2, PIK3R3, PLCG1, SOCS1, and TNS2.
