= DNM3 =

Protein-coding gene found in humans

Identifiers
- Aliases: DNM3, Dyna III, dynamin 3
- External IDs: OMIM: 611445; MGI: 1341299; GeneCards: DNM3
Available structures
PDB	Ortholog search: PDBe RCSB
PDB	List of PDB id codes 3L43, 5A3F
Enzyme activity
EC #	BRENDA	ExPASy	KEGG	MetaCyc
3.6.5.5	↗	↗	↗	↗

Gene location (Human)
Chr.	Chromosome 1 (human)
Band	1q24.3	Start	171,817,887 bp
Band	1q24.3	End	172,418,466 bp

Gene location (Mouse)
Chr.	Chromosome 1 (mouse)
Band	1|1 H2.1	Start	161,810,022 bp
Band	1|1 H2.1	End	162,305,603 bp
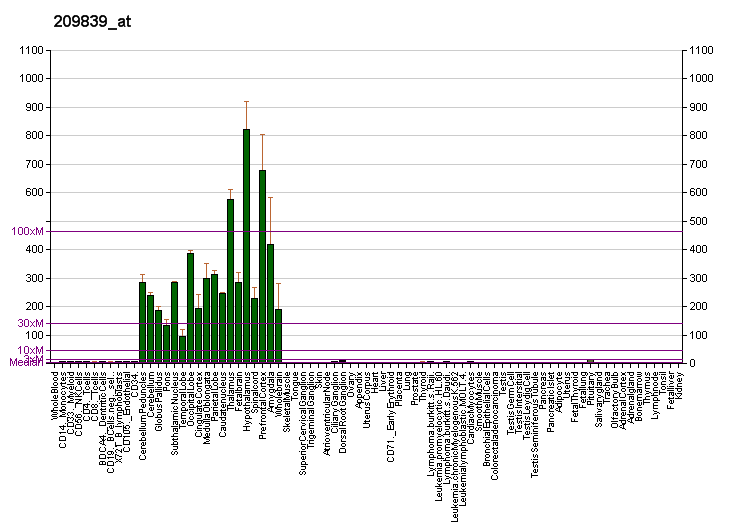
RNA expression pattern
Bgee	Human / Mouse (ortholog); Top expressed in: lateral nuclear group of thalamus; pons; Brodmann area 46; corpus callosum; pars compacta; postcentral gyrus; superior vestibular nucleus; dorsal motor nucleus of vagus nerve; pars reticulata; orbitofrontal cortex / Top expressed in: facial motor nucleus; anterior horn of spinal cord; superior colliculus; central gray substance of midbrain; inferior colliculi; pontine nuclei; medial vestibular nucleus; substantia nigra; dorsal tegmental nucleus; nucleus of stria terminalis; More reference expression data
BioGPS	More reference expression data
Gene ontology
Molecular function	nucleotide binding; nitric-oxide synthase binding; type 1 metabotropic glutamate receptor binding; GTP binding; type 5 metabotropic glutamate receptor binding; protein binding; hydrolase activity; GTPase activity; microtubule binding; identical protein binding; structural constituent of postsynapse
Cellular component	cytoplasm; Golgi apparatus; postsynaptic density; photoreceptor inner segment; dendritic spine; synapse; axon; dendritic spine head; mitochondrion; perinuclear region of cytoplasm; synaptic cleft; microtubule; extracellular exosome; cytoskeleton; mitochondrial membranes; postsynaptic endocytic zone membrane; plasma membrane; membrane; cytoplasmic vesicle; postsynaptic membrane; apical tubulobulbar complex; basal tubulobulbar complex; presynapse; glutamatergic synapse
Biological process	endocytosis; positive regulation of filopodium assembly; regulation of dendritic spine morphogenesis; negative regulation of dendritic spine morphogenesis; mitochondrial fission; dynamin family protein polymerization involved in mitochondrial fission; synapse assembly; filopodium assembly; membrane fusion; synaptic vesicle budding from presynaptic endocytic zone membrane; postsynaptic neurotransmitter receptor internalization; receptor internalization; synaptic vesicle endocytosis; regulation of synapse structure or activity; postsynapse organization; positive regulation of synaptic vesicle recycling
Sources:Amigo / QuickGO
Orthologs
Databases	NCBI: entry; OMA: entry
Species	Human	Mouse
Entrez	26052	103967
Ensembl	ENSG00000197959	ENSMUSG00000040265
UniProt	Q9UQ16	Q8BZ98
RefSeq (mRNA)	NM_001136127; NM_001278252; NM_015569; NM_001350204; NM_001350205 NM_001350206	NM_001038619; NM_172646
RefSeq (protein)	NP_001129599; NP_001265181; NP_056384; NP_001337133; NP_001337134 NP_001337135	NP_001033708; NP_766234
Location (UCSC)	Chr 1: 171.82 – 172.42 Mb	Chr 1: 161.81 – 162.31 Mb
PubMed search
- Wikidata
View/Edit Human	View/Edit Mouse

Dynamin-3 is a protein that in humans is encoded by the DNM3 gene. The protein encoded by this gene is a member of the dynamin family which possess mechanochemical properties involved in actin-membrane processes, predominantly in membrane budding. DNM3 is upregulated in Sézary's syndrome.
