= Hepatocyte growth factor receptor =

Mammalian protein found in Homo sapiens

MET

Identifiers
- Aliases: MET, MET proto-oncogene, receptor tyrosine kinase, AUTS9, HGFR, RCCP2, c-Met, DFNB97, OSFD, c-met
- External IDs: OMIM: 164860; MGI: 96969; GeneCards: MET
Available structures
PDB	Ortholog search: PDBe RCSB
PDB	List of PDB id codes 1FYR, 1R0P, 1R1W, 1SHY, 1SSL, 2G15, 2RFN, 2RFS, 2UZX, 2UZY, 2WD1, 2WGJ, 2WKM, 3A4P, 3BUX, 3C1X, 3CCN, 3CD8, 3CE3, 3CTH, 3CTJ, 3DKC, 3DKF, 3DKG, 3EFJ, 3EFK, 3F66, 3F82, 3I5N, 3L8V, 3LQ8, 3Q6U, 3Q6W, 3QTI, 3R7O, 3RHK, 3U6H, 3U6I, 3VW8, 3ZBX, 3ZC5, 3ZCL, 3ZXZ, 3ZZE, 4AOI, 4AP7, 4DEG, 4DEH, 4DEI, 4EEV, 4GG7, 4IWD, 4K3J, 4KNB, 4MXC, 4O3T, 4O3U, 4R1V, 4R1Y, 4XMO, 4XYF, 5EYC, 5EYD
Enzyme activity
EC #	BRENDA	ExPASy	KEGG	MetaCyc
2.7.10.1	↗	↗	↗	↗

Gene location (Human)
Chr.	Chromosome 7 (human)
Band	7q31.2	Start	116,672,196 bp
Band	7q31.2	End	116,798,377 bp

Gene location (Mouse)
Chr.	Chromosome 6 (mouse)
Band	6 A2|6 7.83 cM	Start	17,463,799 bp
Band	6 A2|6 7.83 cM	End	17,573,979 bp
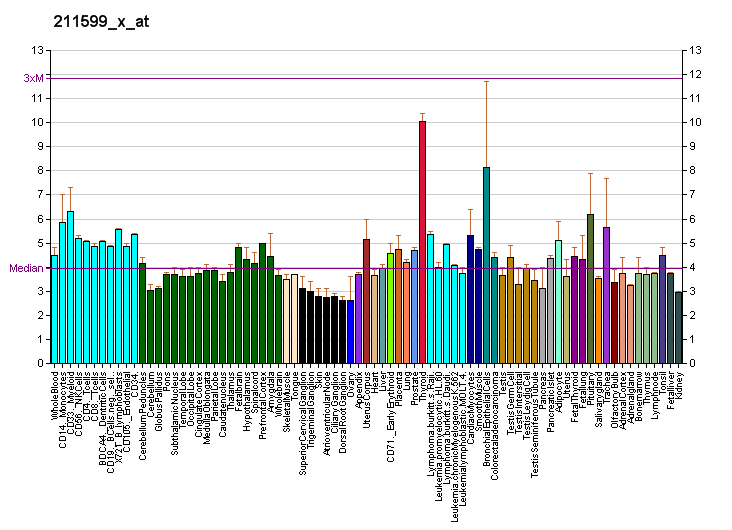

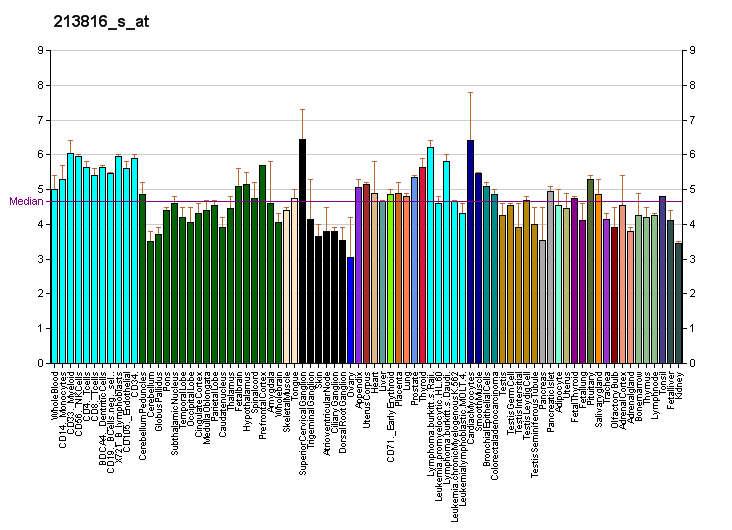

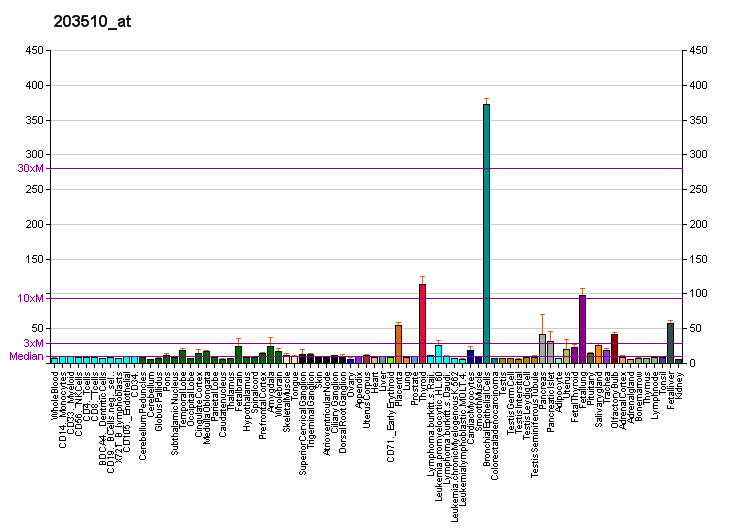
RNA expression pattern
Bgee	Human / Mouse (ortholog); Top expressed in: retinal pigment epithelium; germinal epithelium; cartilage tissue; parietal pleura; Achilles tendon; middle temporal gyrus; bronchial epithelial cell; visceral pleura; kidney tubule; nasal epithelium / Top expressed in: retinal pigment epithelium; iris; conjunctival fornix; vestibular membrane of cochlear duct; ciliary body; left lobe of liver; endothelial cell of lymphatic vessel; left lung lobe; urothelium; lacrimal gland; More reference expression data
BioGPS	More reference expression data
Gene ontology
Molecular function	transferase activity; nucleotide binding; protein kinase activity; hepatocyte growth factor-activated receptor activity; kinase activity; protein binding; transmembrane receptor protein tyrosine kinase activity; protein tyrosine kinase activity; protein phosphatase binding; ATP binding; phosphatidylinositol-4,5-bisphosphate 3-kinase activity; identical protein binding; Wnt-protein binding; semaphorin receptor activity
Cellular component	integral component of membrane; membrane; plasma membrane; integral component of plasma membrane; extracellular region; cell surface; basal plasma membrane; intracellular anatomical structure; receptor complex
Biological process	negative regulation of hydrogen peroxide-mediated programmed cell death; phosphorylation; transmembrane receptor protein tyrosine kinase signaling pathway; positive regulation of endothelial cell chemotaxis; endothelial cell morphogenesis; protein phosphorylation; cell surface receptor signaling pathway; positive chemotaxis; cell population proliferation; negative regulation of autophagy; branching morphogenesis of an epithelial tube; semaphorin-plexin signaling pathway; signal transduction; positive regulation of transcription by RNA polymerase II; peptidyl-tyrosine phosphorylation; hepatocyte growth factor receptor signaling pathway; MAPK cascade; entry of bacterium into host cell; phosphatidylinositol phosphate biosynthetic process; positive regulation of microtubule polymerization; negative regulation of Rho protein signal transduction; negative regulation of stress fiber assembly; establishment of skin barrier; negative regulation of thrombin-activated receptor signaling pathway; negative regulation of guanyl-nucleotide exchange factor activity; positive regulation of protein kinase B signaling; liver development; phagocytosis; nervous system development; Wnt signaling pathway; cell migration; neuron differentiation; pancreas development
Sources:Amigo / QuickGO
Orthologs
Databases	NCBI: entry; OMA: entry
Species	Human	Mouse
Entrez	4233	17295
Ensembl	ENSG00000105976	ENSMUSG00000009376
UniProt	P08581	P16056
RefSeq (mRNA)	NM_000245; NM_001127500; NM_001324401; NM_001324402	NM_008591
RefSeq (protein)	NP_000236; NP_001120972; NP_001311330; NP_001311331	n/a
Location (UCSC)	Chr 7: 116.67 – 116.8 Mb	Chr 6: 17.46 – 17.57 Mb
PubMed search
- Wikidata
View/Edit Human	View/Edit Mouse

Hepatocyte growth factor receptor (HGF receptor) is a protein that in humans is encoded by the MET gene. The protein possesses tyrosine kinase activity. The primary single chain precursor protein is post-translationally cleaved to produce the alpha and beta subunits, which are disulfide linked to form the mature receptor.

HGF receptor is a single pass tyrosine kinase receptor essential for embryonic development, organogenesis and wound healing. Hepatocyte growth factor/scatter factor (HGF/SF) and its splicing isoform (NK1, NK2) are the only known ligands of the HGF receptor. MET is normally expressed by cells of epithelial origin, while expression of HGF/SF is restricted to cells of mesenchymal origin. When HGF/SF binds its cognate receptor MET it induces its dimerization through a not yet completely understood mechanism leading to its activation.

Sometimes MET is misunderstood as of an abbreviation of mesenchymal-epithelial transition. This is incorrect. The three letters of MET come from N-methyl-N'-nitro-N-nitrosoguanidine (MNNG).

Abnormal MET activation in cancer correlates with poor prognosis, where aberrantly active MET triggers tumor growth, formation of new blood vessels (angiogenesis) that supply the tumor with nutrients, and cancer spread to other organs (metastasis). MET is deregulated in many types of human malignancies, including cancers of kidney, liver, stomach, breast, and brain. Normally, only stem cells and progenitor cells express MET, which allows these cells to grow invasively in order to generate new tissues in an embryo or regenerate damaged tissues in an adult. However, cancer stem cells are thought to hijack the ability of normal stem cells to express MET, and thus become the cause of cancer persistence and spread to other sites in the body. Both the overexpression of Met/HGFR, as well as its autocrine activation by co-expression of its hepatocyte growth factor ligand, have been implicated in oncogenesis.

Various mutations in the MET gene are associated with papillary renal carcinoma.

== Gene ==
MET proto-oncogene (GeneID: 4233) has a total length of 125,982 bp, and it is located in the 7q31 locus of chromosome 7. MET is transcribed into a 6,641 bp mature mRNA, which is then translated into a 1,390 amino-acid MET protein.

== Protein ==
MET is a receptor tyrosine kinase (RTK) that is produced as a single-chain precursor. The precursor is proteolytically cleaved at a furin site to yield a highly glycosylated extracellular α-subunit and a transmembrane β-subunit, which are linked together by a disulfide bridge.

=== Extracellular ===
- Region of homology to semaphorins (Sema domain), which includes the full α-chain and the N-terminal part of the β-chain
- Cysteine-rich MET-related sequence (MRS domain)
- Glycine-proline-rich repeats (G-P repeats)
- Four immunoglobulin-like structures (Ig domains), a typical protein-protein interaction region.

=== Intracellular ===
A juxtamembrane segment that contains:

- A serine residue (Ser 985), which inhibits the receptor kinase activity upon phosphorylation
- A tyrosine residue (Tyr 1003), which is responsible for MET polyubiquitination, endocytosis, and degradation upon interaction with the ubiquitin ligase CBL
- Tyrosine kinase domain, which mediates MET biological activity. Following MET activation, transphosphorylation occurs on Tyr 1234 and Tyr 1235
- C-terminal region contains two crucial tyrosines (Tyr 1349 and Tyr 1356), which are inserted into the multisubstrate docking site, capable of recruiting downstream adapter proteins with Src homology-2 (SH2) domains. The two tyrosines of the docking site have been reported to be necessary and sufficient for the signal transduction both in vitro.

== MET signaling pathway ==
MET activation by its ligand HGF induces MET kinase catalytic activity, which triggers transphosphorylation of the tyrosines Tyr 1234 and Tyr 1235. These two tyrosines engage various signal transducers, thus initiating a whole spectrum of biological activities driven by MET, collectively known as the invasive growth program. The transducers interact with the intracellular multisubstrate docking site of MET either directly, such as GRB2, SHC, SRC, and the p85 regulatory subunit of phosphatidylinositol-3 kinase (PI3K), or indirectly through the scaffolding protein Gab1

Tyr 1349 and Tyr 1356 of the multisubstrate docking site are both involved in the interaction with GAB1, SRC, and SHC, while only Tyr 1356 is involved in the recruitment of GRB2, phospholipase C γ (PLC-γ), p85, and SHP2.

GAB1 is a key coordinator of the cellular responses to MET and binds the MET intracellular region with high avidity, but low affinity. Upon interaction with MET, GAB1 becomes phosphorylated on several tyrosine residues which, in turn, recruit a number of signalling effectors, including PI3K, SHP2, and PLC-γ. GAB1 phosphorylation by MET results in a sustained signal that mediates most of the downstream signaling pathways.

=== Activation of signal transduction ===
MET engagement activates multiple signal transduction pathways:

- The RAS pathway mediates HGF-induced scattering and proliferation signals, which lead to branching morphogenesis. Of note, HGF, differently from most mitogens, induces sustained RAS activation, and thus prolonged MAPK activity.
- The PI3K pathway is activated in two ways: PI3K can be either downstream of RAS, or it can be recruited directly through the multifunctional docking site. Activation of the PI3K pathway is currently associated with cell motility through remodeling of adhesion to the extracellular matrix as well as localized recruitment of transducers involved in cytoskeletal reorganization, such as RAC1 and PAK. PI3K activation also triggers a survival signal due to activation of the AKT pathway.
- The STAT pathway, together with the sustained MAPK activation, is necessary for the HGF-induced branching morphogenesis. MET activates the STAT3 transcription factor directly, through an SH2 domain.
- The beta-catenin pathway, a key component of the Wnt signaling pathway, translocates into the nucleus following MET activation and participates in transcriptional regulation of numerous genes.
- The Notch pathway, through transcriptional activation of Delta ligand (see DLL3).

== Role in development ==
MET mediates a complex program known as invasive growth. Activation of MET triggers mitogenesis, and morphogenesis.

During embryonic development, transformation of the flat, two-layer germinal disc into a three-dimensional body depends on transition of some cells from an epithelial phenotype to spindle-shaped cells with motile behaviour, a mesenchymal phenotype. This process is referred to as epithelial-mesenchymal transition (EMT). Later in embryonic development, MET is crucial for gastrulation, angiogenesis, myoblast migration, bone remodeling, and nerve sprouting among others. MET is essential for embryogenesis, because MET ^{−/−} mice die in utero due to severe defects in placental development. Along with Ectodysplasin A, it has been shown to be involved in the differentiation of anatomical placodes, precursors of scales, feathers and hair follicles in vertebrates. Furthermore, MET is required for such critical processes as liver regeneration and wound healing during adulthood.

HGF/MET axis is also involved in myocardial development. Both HGF and MET receptor mRNAs are co-expressed in cardiomyocytes from E7.5, soon after the heart has been determined, to E9.5. Transcripts for HGF ligand and receptor are first detected before the occurrence of cardiac beating and looping, and persist throughout the looping stage, when heart morphology begins to elaborate. In avian studies, HGF was found in the myocardial layer of the atrioventricular canal, in a developmental stage in which the epithelial to mesenchymal transformation (EMT) of the endocardial cushion occurs. However, MET is not essential for heart development, since α-MHCMet-KO mice show normal heart development.

== Expression ==
=== Tissue distribution ===
MET is normally expressed by epithelial cells. However, MET is also found on endothelial cells, neurons, hepatocytes, hematopoietic cells, melanocytes and neonatal cardiomyocytes. HGF expression is restricted to cells of mesenchymal origin.

=== Transcriptional control ===
MET transcription is activated by HGF and several growth factors. MET promoter has four putative binding sites for Ets, a family of transcription factors that control several invasive growth genes. ETS1 activates MET transcription in vitro. MET transcription is activated by hypoxia-inducible factor 1 (HIF1), which is activated by low concentration of intracellular oxygen. HIF1 can bind to one of the several hypoxia response elements (HREs) in the MET promoter. Hypoxia also activates transcription factor AP-1, which is involved in MET transcription.

== Clinical significance ==
=== Role in cancer ===
MET pathway plays an important role in the development of cancer through:

- activation of key oncogenic pathways (RAS, PI3K, STAT3, beta-catenin);
- angiogenesis (sprouting of new blood vessels from pre-existing ones to supply a tumor with nutrients);
- scatter (cells dissociation due to metalloprotease production), which often leads to metastasis.

Coordinated down-regulation of both MET and its downstream effector extracellular signal-regulated kinase 2 (ERK2) by miR-199a* may be effective in inhibiting not only cell proliferation but also motility and invasive capabilities of tumor cells.

MET amplification has emerged as a potential biomarker of the clear cell tumor subtype.

The amplification of the cell surface receptor MET often drives resistance to anti-EGFR therapies in colorectal cancer.

=== Role in autism ===
The SFARIgene database lists MET with an autism score of 2.0, which indicates that it is a strong candidate for playing a role in cases of autism. The database also identifies at least one study that found a role for MET in cases of schizophrenia. The gene was first implicated in autism in a study that identified a polymorphism in the promoter of the MET gene. The polymorphism reduces transcription by 50%. Further, the variant as an autism risk polymorphism has been replicated, and shown to be enriched in children with autism and gastrointestinal disturbances. A rare mutation has been found that appears in two family members, one with autism and the other with a social and communication disorder. The role of the receptor in brain development is distinct from its role in other developmental processes. Activation of the MET receptor regulates synapse formation and can impact the development and function of circuits involved in social and emotional behavior.

=== Role in heart function ===
In adult mice, MET is required to protect cardiomyocytes by preventing age-related oxidative stress, apoptosis, fibrosis and cardiac dysfunction. Moreover, MET inhibitors, such as crizotinib or PF-04254644, have been tested by short-term treatments in cellular and preclinical models, and have been shown to induce cardiomyocytes death through ROS production, activation of caspases, metabolism alteration and blockage of ion channels.

In the injured heart, HGF/MET axis plays important roles in cardioprotection by promoting pro-survival (anti-apoptotic and anti-autophagic) effects in cardiomyocytes, angiogenesis, inhibition of fibrosis, anti-inflammatory and immunomodulatory signals, and regeneration through activation of cardiac stem cells.

== Interaction with tumour suppressor genes ==
=== PTEN ===
PTEN (phosphatase and tensin homolog) is a tumor suppressor gene encoding a protein PTEN, which possesses lipid and protein phosphatase-dependent as well as phosphatase-independent activities. PTEN protein phosphatase is able to interfere with MET signaling by dephosphorylating either PIP_{3} generated by PI3K, or the p52 isoform of SHC. SHC dephosphorylation inhibits recruitment of the GRB2 adapter to activated MET.

=== VHL ===
There is evidence of correlation between inactivation of VHL tumor suppressor gene and increased MET signaling in renal cell carcinoma (RCC) and also in malignant transformations of the heart.

== Cancer therapies targeting HGF/MET ==
Since tumor invasion and metastasis are the main cause of death in cancer patients, interfering with MET signaling appears to be a promising therapeutic approach. A comprehensive list of HGF and MET targeted experimental therapeutics for oncology now in human clinical trials can be found here.

=== MET kinase inhibitors ===
Kinase inhibitors are low molecular weight molecules that prevent ATP binding to MET, thus inhibiting receptor transphosphorylation and recruitment of the downstream effectors. The limitations of kinase inhibitors include the facts that they only inhibit kinase-dependent MET activation, and that none of them is fully specific for MET.

- K252a (Fermentek Biotechnology) is a staurosporine analogue isolated from Nocardiopsis sp. soil fungi, and it is a potent inhibitor of all receptor tyrosine kinases (RTKs). At nanomolar concentrations, K252a inhibits both the wild type and the mutant (M1268T) MET function.
- SU11274 (SUGEN) specifically inhibits MET kinase activity and its subsequent signaling. SU11274 is also an effective inhibitor of the M1268T and H1112Y MET mutants, but not the L1213V and Y1248H mutants. SU11274 has been demonstrated to inhibit HGF-induced motility and invasion of epithelial and carcinoma cells.
- PHA-665752 (Pfizer) specifically inhibits MET kinase activity, and it has been demonstrated to represses both HGF-dependent and constitutive MET phosphorylation. Furthermore, some tumors harboring MET amplifications are highly sensitive to treatment with PHA-665752.
- Tivantinib (ArQule) is a promising selective inhibitor of MET, which entered a phase 2 clinical trial in 2008. (Failed a phase 3 in 2017)
- Foretinib (XL880, Exelixis) targets multiple receptor tyrosine kinases (RTKs) with growth-promoting and angiogenic properties. The primary targets of foretinib are MET, VEGFR2, and KDR. Foretinib has completed a phase 2 clinical trials with indications for papillary renal cell carcinoma, gastric cancer, and head and neck cancer
- SGX523 (SGX Pharmaceuticals) specifically inhibits MET at low nanomolar concentrations.
- MP470 (SuperGen) is a novel inhibitor of c-KIT, MET, PDGFR, Flt3, and AXL. Phase I clinical trial of MP470 had been announced in 2007.
- Vebreltinib, approved in China for the treatment of non-small-cell lung cancer.

=== HGF inhibitors ===
Since HGF is the only known ligand of MET, blocking the formation of a HGF:MET complex blocks MET biological activity. For this purpose, truncated HGF, anti-HGF neutralizing antibodies, and an uncleavable form of HGF have been utilized so far. The major limitation of HGF inhibitors is that they block only HGF-dependent MET activation.

- NK4 competes with HGF as it binds MET without inducing receptor activation, thus behaving as a full antagonist. NK4 is a molecule bearing the N-terminal hairpin and the four kringle domains of HGF. Moreover, NK4 is structurally similar to angiostatins, which is why it possesses anti-angiogenic activity.
- Neutralizing anti-HGF antibodies were initially tested in combination, and it was shown that at least three antibodies, acting on different HGF epitopes, are necessary to prevent MET tyrosine kinase activation. More recently, it has been demonstrated that fully human monoclonal antibodies can individually bind and neutralize human HGF, leading to regression of tumors in mouse models. Two anti-HGF antibodies are currently available: the humanized AV299 (AVEO), and the fully human AMG102 (Amgen).
- Uncleavable HGF is an engineered form of pro-HGF carrying a single amino-acid substitution, which prevents the maturation of the molecule. Uncleavable HGF is capable of blocking MET-induced biological responses by binding MET with high affinity and displacing mature HGF. Moreover, uncleavable HGF competes with the wild-type endogenous pro-HGF for the catalytic domain of proteases that cleave HGF precursors. Local and systemic expression of uncleavable HGF inhibits tumor growth and, more importantly, prevents metastasis.

=== Decoy MET ===
Decoy MET refers to a soluble truncated MET receptor. Decoys are able to inhibit MET activation mediated by both HGF-dependent and independent mechanisms, as decoys prevent both the ligand binding and the MET receptor homodimerization. CGEN241 (Compugen) is a decoy MET that is highly efficient in inhibiting tumor growth and preventing metastasis in animal models.

=== Immunotherapy targeting MET ===
Drugs used for immunotherapy can act either passively by enhancing the immunologic response to MET-expressing tumor cells, or actively by stimulating immune cells and altering differentiation/growth of tumor cells.

==== Passive immunotherapy ====
Administering monoclonal antibodies (mAbs) is a form of passive immunotherapy. MAbs facilitate destruction of tumor cells by complement-dependent cytotoxicity (CDC) and cell-mediated cytotoxicity (ADCC). In CDC, mAbs bind to specific antigen, leading to activation of the complement cascade, which in turn leads to formation of pores in tumor cells. In ADCC, the Fab domain of a mAb binds to a tumor antigen, and Fc domain binds to Fc receptors present on effector cells (phagocytes and NK cells), thus forming a bridge between an effector and a target cells. This induces the effector cell activation, leading to phagocytosis of the tumor cell by neutrophils and macrophages. Furthermore, NK cells release cytotoxic molecules, which lyse tumor cells.

- DN30 is monoclonal anti-MET antibody that recognizes the extracellular portion of MET. DN30 induces both shedding of the MET ectodomain as well as cleavage of the intracellular domain, which is successively degraded by proteasome machinery. As a consequence, on one side MET is inactivated, and on the other side the shed portion of extracellular MET hampers activation of other MET receptors, acting as a decoy. DN30 inhibits tumour growth and prevents metastasis in animal models.
- OA-5D5 is one-armed monoclonal anti-MET antibody that was demonstrated to inhibit orthotopic pancreatic and glioblastoma tumor growth and to improve survival in tumor xenograft models. OA-5D5 is produced as a recombinant protein in Escherichia coli. It is composed of murine variable domains for the heavy and light chains with human IgG1 constant domains. The antibody blocks HGF binding to MET in a competitive fashion.

==== Active immunotherapy ====
Active immunotherapy to MET-expressing tumors can be achieved by administering cytokines, such as interferons (IFNs) and interleukins (IL-2), which triggers non-specific stimulation of numerous immune cells. IFNs have been tested as therapies for many types of cancers and have demonstrated therapeutic benefits. IL-2 has been approved by the U.S. Food and Drug Administration (FDA) for the treatment of renal cell carcinoma and metastatic melanoma, which often have deregulated MET activity.

== Potentiators ==
Positive modulators of HGF and MET signaling include dihexa (PNB-0408), fosgonimeton (ATH-1017), and brelgometon (ATH-1105).

== Interactions ==
Met has been shown to interact with:

- CDH1,
- Cbl gene,
- GLMN,
- Grb2,
- Hepatocyte growth factor,
- PTPmu, and
- RANBP9

== See also ==
- c-Met inhibitors
- Tpr-met fusion protein
