= Exelixis =

American biotechnology company

Exelixis, Inc.
- Formerly: Exelixis Pharmaceuticals, Inc. (1994-2000)
- Type: Public
- Traded as: Nasdaq: EXEL; S&P 400 component
- Industry: Biotechnology
- Founded: November 1994; 32 years ago
- Headquarters: Alameda, California, U.S.
- Key people: Stelios Papadopoulos, Ph.D. (chairman); Michael M. Morrissey, Ph.D. (president & CEO)
- Revenue: ▲US$ 2.32 Billion (2025)
- Operating income: ▲US$ 0.872 Billion (2025)
- Net income: ▲US$ 0.783 Billion (2025)
- Total assets: ▲US$ 2.844 Billion (2025)
- Total equity: ▲US$ 2.161 Billion (2021)
- Number of employees: 1,077 (2025)
- Website: exelixis.com

Exelixis, Inc. is a genomics-based drug discovery company located in Alameda, California, and the producer of Cometriq, a treatment approved by the U.S. Food and Drug Administration (FDA) for medullary thyroid cancer with clinical activity in several other types of metastatic cancer.

== History ==
Exelixis was founded in 1994; the scientific founders were Spyridon Artavanis–Tsakonas, at Yale at that time, and Corey Goodman and Gerry Rubin who were then at the University of California, Berkeley. George Scangos joined the company as CEO in 1996. The business plan was to use model organisms (fruit flies, nematodes, and zebrafish) and functional genomics to identify pathways and biological targets that could be exploited in the fields of agriculture and medicine. It eventually set up a subsidiary, Exelixis Plant Sciences, for the agricultural work.

By 2000, Exelixis had left the radical exploratory phase behind and became focused on drug discovery and had a chemical library of 4 million compounds. The company went public that year, after withdrawing its offering the week before; it raised $118 million in a down market.

In 2002, the company signed a broad alliance with GSK to discover new drugs in the fields of cancer, inflammatory diseases, and vascular conditions; GSK paid it $30 million in cash, bought $14 million in stock at twice the market rate, and committed to providing Exelixis with $90 million in research funding; it also offered loan financing of up to $85 million. By 2002, the company had limited its internal efforts to cancer, and had settled its strategy on discovering and developing drugs that could inhibit targeted small sets of tyrosine kinases that are needed for cancer formation, growth, and metastasis. The sets of TKs had been identified by means of its prior functional genomics work. This approach was controversial at the time; most companies try to selectively target just one protein in their discovery efforts.

In 2006, Exelixis partnered with Daiichi Sankyo on compounds that targeted mineralocorticoid receptors; esaxerenone was part of this collaboration. In 2007, the company partnered its MEK inhibitor program with Genentech; cobimetinib (at that time XL-518) was part of this collaboration. Exelixis had filed an IND on XL-518 prior to the partnership, committed to funding and running the Phase I trial, and retained rights to co-market it in the US.

In 2008, the company partnered its lead cancer drug candidate, XL-184 (which would become called cabozantinib) and another cancer candidate, XL-281, with Bristol Myers Squibb; BMS returned the rights to XL-184 to Exelixis in 2010 and returned the rights to other drug candidate in 2011.

In 2010, Scangos departed as CEO to take over at Biogen and the company appointed Michael M. Morrissey as president and CEO; Morrissey had joined the company in 2000 as Vice President of Discovery Research. At that time the company had eight drugs in clinical trials. Exelixis' first drug approval came in 2012, when cabozantinib was approved for medullary thyroid cancer, an orphan indication. It was approved in Europe in 2014. Exelixis invested heavily in exploring cabozantinib in other cancers, betting the future of the company on the drug. In 2014, the drug failed a Phase III trial in prostate cancer, and the company laid off 70% of its employees. In 2015, Genentech and Exelixis won FDA approval for cobimetinib for certain forms of melanoma.

In March 2016, Exelixis licensed to Ipsen worldwide rights (outside the US, Canada, and Japan) to market cabozantinib. In April 2016, the FDA granted approval for marketing the tablet formulation as a second line treatment for kidney cancer and the same was approved in Europe in October of that year.

In December 2017, the FDA granted approval for the use of cabozantinib for first line treatment of kidney cancer and in 2018, approval for first-line treatment was approved in Europe.

== Finance ==
=== Pricing ===
==== Cabometyx (cabozantinib) ====
In 2023, the Institute for Clinical and Economic Review (ICER) identified Cabometyx (cabozantinib) as one of five high-expenditure drugs that experienced significant net price increases without new clinical evidence to justify the hikes. Specifically, Cabometyx's wholesale acquisition cost rose by 7.5%, leading to an additional $86 million in costs to U.S. payers.
