= Hepatocyte growth factor =

Mammalian protein found in Homo sapiens

HGF
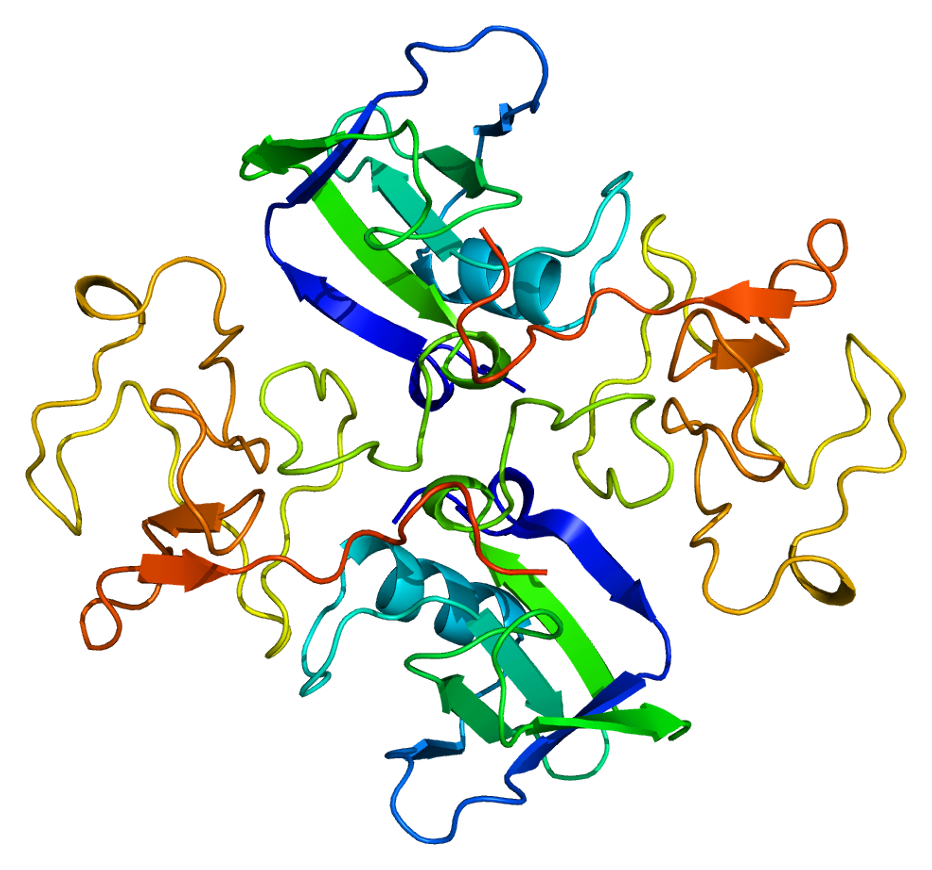

Identifiers
- Aliases: HGF, DFNB39, F-TCF, HGFB, HPTA, SF, hepatocyte growth factor
- External IDs: OMIM: 142409; MGI: 96079; GeneCards: HGF
Available structures
PDB	Ortholog search: PDBe RCSB
PDB	List of PDB id codes 1BHT, 1GMN, 1GMO, 1GP9, 1NK1, 1SHY, 1SI5, 2HGF, 2QJ2, 3HMS, 3HMT, 3HN4, 3MKP, 3SP8, 4K3J, 4O3T, 4O3U, 5COE, 5CP9, 5CS1, 5CS3, 5CS5, 5CS9, 5CSQ, 5CT1, 5CT2, 5CT3, 4D3C

Gene location (Human)
Chr.	Chromosome 7 (human)
Band	7q21.11	Start	81,699,010 bp
Band	7q21.11	End	81,770,438 bp

Gene location (Mouse)
Chr.	Chromosome 5 (mouse)
Band	5 A3|5 7.07 cM	Start	16,758,493 bp
Band	5 A3|5 7.07 cM	End	16,825,150 bp

RNA expression pattern
Bgee	Human / Mouse (ortholog); Top expressed in: placenta; stromal cell of endometrium; visceral pleura; buccal mucosa cell; monocyte; pancreatic epithelial cell; gallbladder; Epithelium of choroid plexus; liver; right coronary artery / Top expressed in: lumbar spinal ganglion; granulocyte; urethra; stria vascularis; genital tubercle; embryo; primitive endoderm; pineal gland; abdominal wall; right lung lobe; More reference expression data
BioGPS	More reference expression data
Gene ontology
Molecular function	protein binding; identical protein binding; chemoattractant activity; protein heterodimerization activity; growth factor activity; serine-type endopeptidase activity; protein tyrosine kinase activity; phosphatidylinositol-4,5-bisphosphate 3-kinase activity
Cellular component	membrane; extracellular region; platelet alpha granule lumen; extracellular space
Biological process	negative regulation of cysteine-type endopeptidase activity involved in apoptotic process; negative regulation of hydrogen peroxide-mediated programmed cell death; positive regulation of neuron projection regeneration; positive regulation of interleukin-10 production; positive regulation of cell migration; cellular response to hepatocyte growth factor stimulus; negative regulation of release of cytochrome c from mitochondria; negative regulation of interleukin-6 production; platelet degranulation; negative regulation of apoptotic process; regulation of branching involved in salivary gland morphogenesis by mesenchymal-epithelial signaling; positive regulation of angiogenesis; positive regulation of myelination; positive regulation of osteoblast differentiation; myoblast proliferation; negative regulation of extrinsic apoptotic signaling pathway via death domain receptors; animal organ regeneration; cell morphogenesis; positive regulation of cell population proliferation; hyaluronan metabolic process; positive regulation of DNA biosynthetic process; negative regulation of peptidyl-serine phosphorylation; epithelial to mesenchymal transition; positive regulation of peptidyl-tyrosine phosphorylation; cell chemotaxis; liver development; positive regulation of phosphatidylinositol 3-kinase signaling; regulation of p38MAPK cascade; cell population proliferation; negative regulation of autophagy; hepatocyte growth factor receptor signaling pathway; negative regulation of inflammatory response; positive regulation of transcription by RNA polymerase II; regulation of tau-protein kinase activity; proteolysis; positive chemotaxis; MAPK cascade; peptidyl-tyrosine phosphorylation; phosphatidylinositol phosphate biosynthetic process; mitotic cell cycle; regulation of signaling receptor activity; positive regulation of protein kinase B signaling; positive regulation of protein phosphorylation; cytokine-mediated signaling pathway; epithelial cell proliferation
Sources:Amigo / QuickGO
Orthologs
Databases	NCBI: entry; OMA: entry
Species	Human	Mouse
Entrez	3082	15234
Ensembl	ENSG00000019991	ENSMUSG00000028864
UniProt	P14210	Q08048
RefSeq (mRNA)	NM_000601; NM_001010931; NM_001010932; NM_001010933; NM_001010934	NM_010427; NM_001289458; NM_001289459; NM_001289460; NM_001289461
RefSeq (protein)	NP_000592; NP_001010931; NP_001010932; NP_001010933; NP_001010934	NP_001276387; NP_001276388; NP_001276389; NP_001276390; NP_034557
Location (UCSC)	Chr 7: 81.7 – 81.77 Mb	Chr 5: 16.76 – 16.83 Mb
PubMed search
- Wikidata
View/Edit Human	View/Edit Mouse

Hepatocyte growth factor (HGF) or scatter factor (SF) is a paracrine cellular growth, motility and morphogenic factor. It is secreted by mesenchymal cells and targets and acts primarily upon epithelial cells and endothelial cells, but also acts on haemopoietic progenitor cells and T cells. It has been shown to have a major role in embryonic organ development, specifically in myogenesis, in adult organ regeneration, and in wound healing.

== Function ==
Hepatocyte growth factor regulates cell growth, cell motility, and morphogenesis by activating a tyrosine kinase signaling cascade after binding to the proto-oncogenic c-Met receptor. Hepatocyte growth factor is secreted by platelets, and mesenchymal cells and acts as a multi-functional cytokine on cells of mainly epithelial origin. Its ability to stimulate mitogenesis, cell motility, and matrix invasion gives it a central role in angiogenesis, tumorogenesis, and tissue regeneration.

== Structure ==
It is secreted as a single inactive polypeptide and is cleaved by serine proteases into a 69-kDa alpha-chain and 34-kDa beta-chain. A disulfide bond between the alpha and beta chains produces the active, heterodimeric molecule. The protein belongs to the plasminogen subfamily of S1 peptidases but has no detectable protease activity.

== Clinical significance ==
Human HGF plasmid DNA therapy of cardiomyocytes is being examined as a potential treatment for coronary artery disease as well as treatment for the damage that occurs to the heart after myocardial infarction. As well as the well-characterised effects of HGF on epithelial cells, endothelial cells and haemopoietic progenitor cells, HGF also regulates the chemotaxis of T cells into heart tissue. Binding of HGF by c-Met, expressed on T cells, causes the upregulation of c-Met, CXCR3, and CCR4 which in turn imbues them with the ability to migrate into heart tissue. HGF also promotes angiogenesis in ischemia injury. HGF may further play a role as an indicator for prognosis of chronicity for Chikungunya virus induced arthralgia. High HGF levels correlate with high rates of recovery.

Excessive local expression of HGF in the breasts has been implicated in macromastia. HGF is also importantly involved in normal mammary gland development.

HGF has been implicated in a variety of cancers, including of the lungs, pancreas, thyroid, colon, and breast.

Increased expression of HGF has been associated with the enhanced and scarless wound healing capabilities of fibroblast cells isolated from the oral mucosa tissue.

=== Circulating plasma levels ===
Plasma from patients with advanced heart failure presents increased levels of HGF, which correlates with a negative prognosis and a high risk of mortality. Circulating HGF has been also identified as a prognostic marker of severity in patients with hypertension. Circulating HGF has been also suggested as a precocious biomarker for the acute phase of bowel inflammation.

== Pharmacokinetics ==
Exogenous HGF administered by intravenous injection is cleared rapidly from circulation by the liver, with a half-life of approximately 4 minutes.

== Modulators ==
Dihexa is an orally active, centrally penetrant small-molecule compound that directly binds to HGF and potentiates its ability to activate its receptor, c-Met. It is a strong inducer of neurogenesis and is being studied for the potential treatment of Alzheimer's disease and Parkinson's disease.

== Interactions ==
Hepatocyte growth factor has been shown to interact with the protein product of the c-Met oncogene, identified as the HGF receptor (HGFR). Both overexpression of the Met/HGFR receptor protein and autocrine activation of Met/HGFR by simultaneous expression of the hepatocyte growth factor ligand have been implicated in oncogenesis. Hepatocyte growth factor interacts with the sulfated glycosaminoglycans heparan sulfate and dermatan sulfate. The interaction with heparan sulfate allows hepatocyte growth factor to form a complex with c-Met that is able to transduce intracellular signals leading to cell division and cell migration.

== See also ==
- Epidermal growth factor
- Insulin-like growth factor 1
- Epithelial–mesenchymal transition
- Madin-Darby Canine Kidney Cells
