= Papillary renal cell carcinoma =

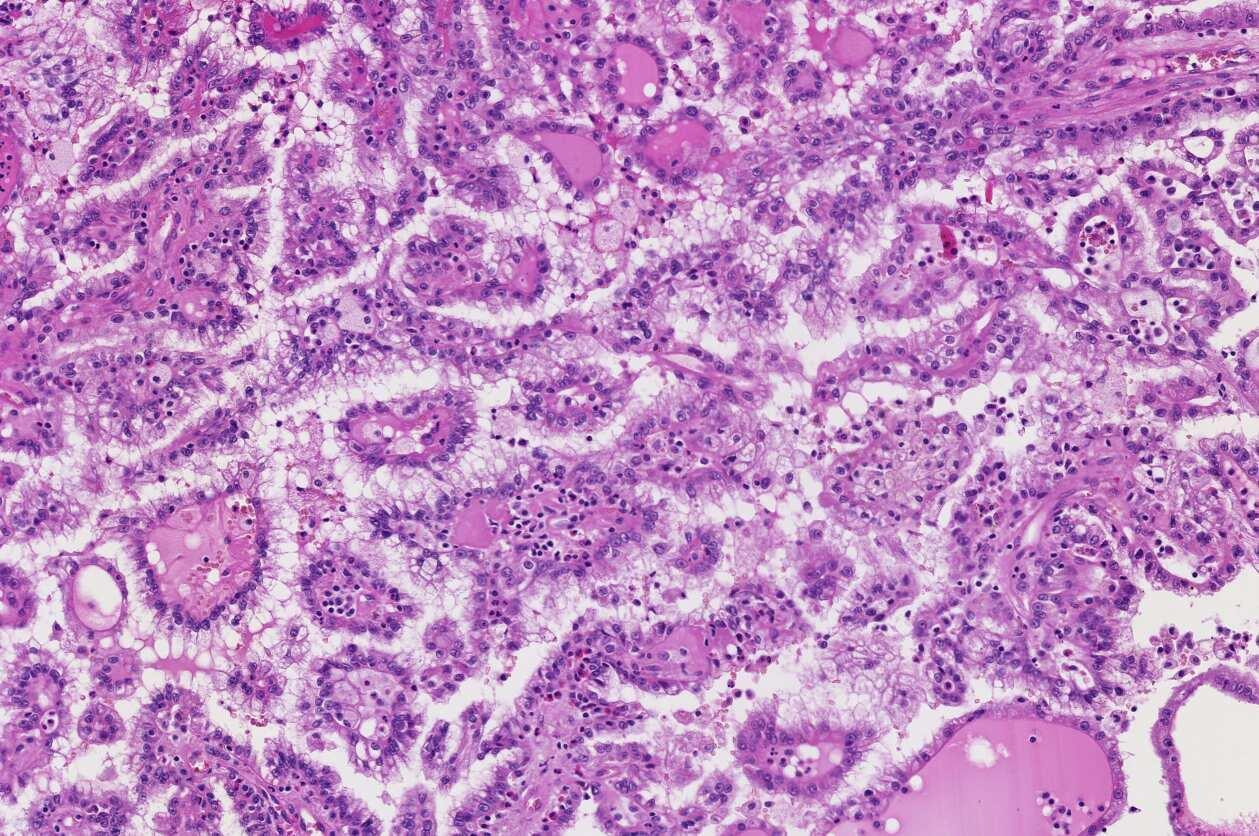
- Papillary renal cell carcinoma, type 1, characterised by tubulopapillary architecture with admixed foamy histiocytes in the papillary cores.
- Specialty: Oncology
- Symptoms: Hematuria, flank pain, palpable abdominal mass
- Diagnostic method: Medical Image Test (ultrasound, computed tomography, magnetic resonance imaging)
- Treatment: Nephrectomy, partial nephretocmy, targeted molecular therapy
- Prognosis: 82-90% for five-year survival rate

Papillary renal cell carcinoma (PRCC), also known as chromophil renal cell carcinoma, is a malignant, heterogeneous tumor originating from renal tubular epithelial cells of the kidney, which comprises approximately 10-15% of all kidney neoplasms. Based on its morphological features, PRCC can be classified into two main subtypes, which are type 1 (basophilic) and type 2 (eosinophilic).

As with other types of renal cell cancer, most cases of PRCC are discovered incidentally without showing specific signs or symptoms of cancer. In advanced stages, hematuria, flank pain, and abdominal mass are the three classic manifestation. While a complete list of the causes of PRCC remains unclear, several risk factors were identified to affect PRCC development, such as genetic mutations, kidney-related disease, environmental and lifestyle risk factors. For pathogenesis, type 1 PRCC is mainly caused by MET gene mutation while type 2 PRCC is associated with several different genetic pathways. For diagnosis, PRCC is detectable through computed tomography (CT) scans or magnetic resonance imaging (MRI), which commonly present a small homogeneous hyposvascular tumor. Nephrectomy or partial nephrectomy is usually recommended for PRCC treatment, often accompanied with several targeted molecular therapies to inhibit metastatic spread. PRCC patients are predominantly male with a mean age of 52–66 years. When compared to conventional clear cell renal cell carcinoma (RCC), the prognosis of non-metastatic PRCC is more favorable, whereas a relatively worse outcome was reported in patients with metastatic disease. Globally, the incidence of PRCC ranges between 3,500 and 5,000 cases, while it greatly varies depending on gender, age, and race/ethnicity.

== Classification ==
In 2014, PRCC was first acknowledged as a renal tumor subtype by the World Health Organization (WHO) considering its distinct genetic, molecular and histologic characteristics. It is further divided into type 1 and type 2 based on morphological features.

=== Type 1 Papillary Renal Cell Carcinoma ===
Type 1 PRCC, also known as a renal tumor caused by a genetic predisposition of hereditary papillary renal cancer syndrome, compromises approximately 25% of all PRCCs. In the perspective of immunochemistry, it has a profile of strong CK7 and alpha-methyl acyl-CoA racemase (AMACR) expression at most focal CA-IX expression. Histologically, its epithelium is composed of relatively small-sized simple cuboidal cells lined in a single layer. These cells are well-characterized by basophilic cytoplasm. Due to its solid growth, an extremely compact papillary architecture is often observed. Other morphological characteristics include intracellular hemosiderin and foamy macrophages placed inside of papillary fibrovascular cores or psammoma bodies. In general, the nuclei of type 1 PRCC belong to grade 1-2 of the Fuhrman system.

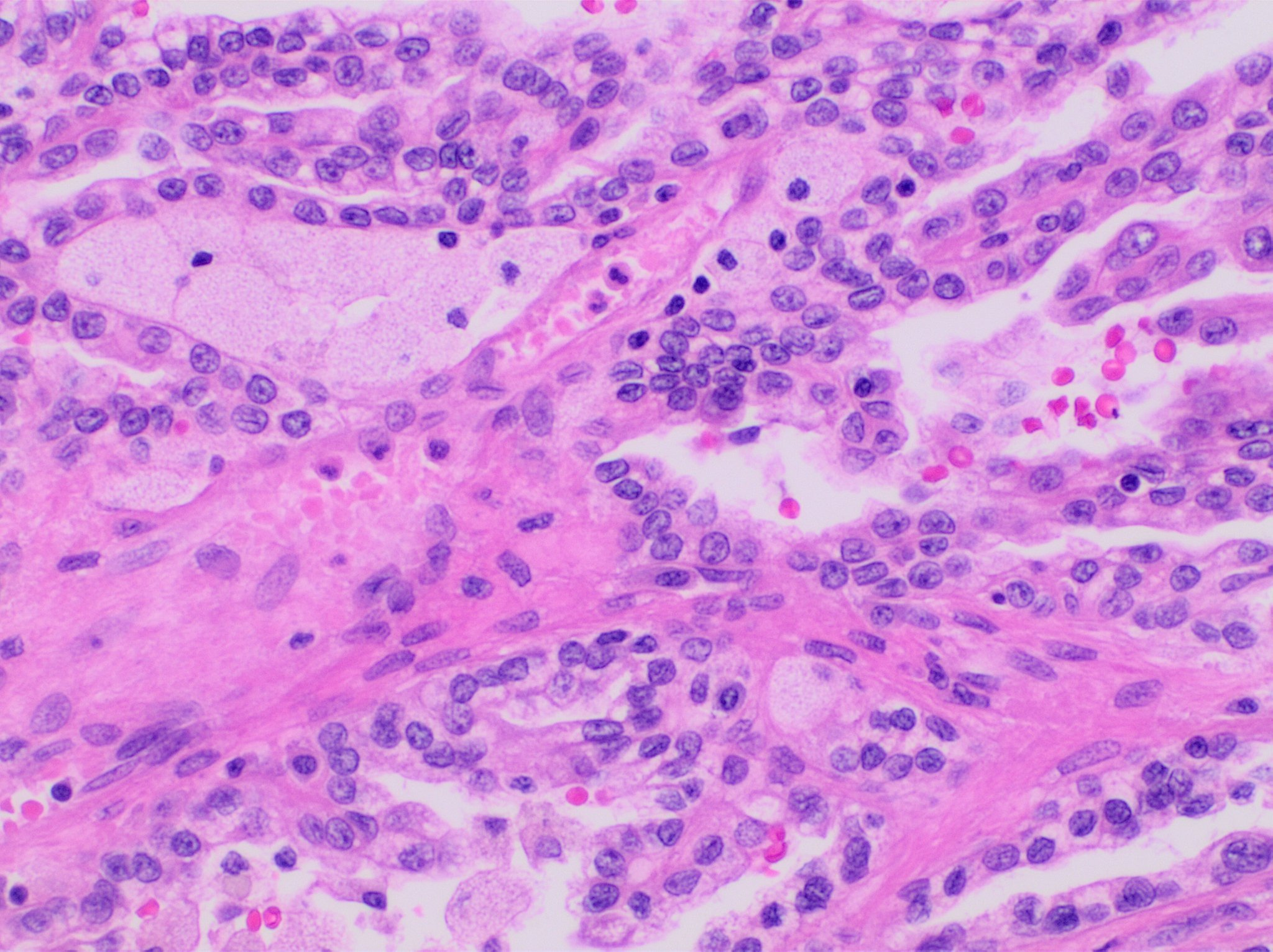
A micrograph of type 1 PRCC, illustrating features of small basophilic cells with scarce cytoplasm. A single layer of cells are surrounding the basal membrane. Foamy macrophages are inside of papillary fibrovascular cores.

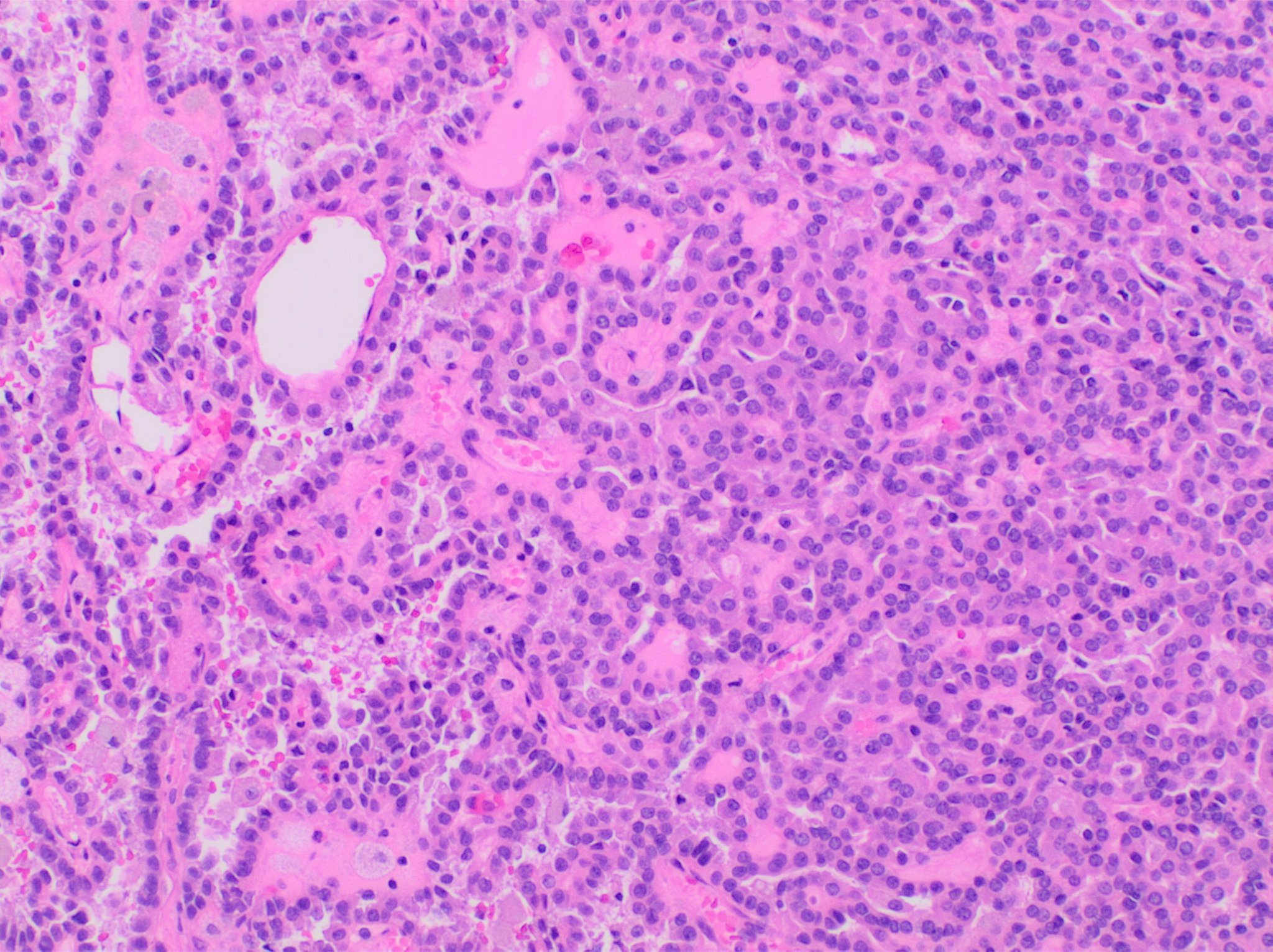
Type 1 PRCC, this case being more compact at right.

=== Type 2 Papillary renal cell carcinoma ===
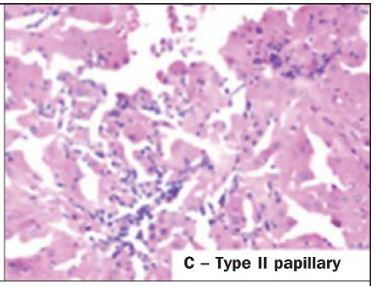
A micrograph of Type 2 PRCC, showing cells containing abundant eosinophilic granular cytoplasm with prominent nucleoli.

Accounting for 25% of PRCCs, type 2 PRCC is the pathological subtype that is most commonly associated with hereditary leiomyomatosis and renal cell carcinoma (HLRCC) syndrome. When compared to type 1, it shows more variation in protein expression mostly by loss of CK7. In a gross examination, it shows papillae covered by large cells abundant in eosinophilic cytoplasm. Its large spherical nuclei on papillary cores are arranged in a pseudo-stratified manner. Unlike type 1 PRCC, foamy macrophages and psammoma bodies are less common in case of type 2. The majority of type 2 PRCC has high Fuhrman grade nuclei with prominent nucleoli.

== Signs and symptoms ==
Due to its asymptomatic nature, PRCC is often undetectable, and the majority of cases are incidentally diagnosed during the radiological workup of unrelated diseases. Its clinical manifestations are similar to those of clear cell RCC, which are the classical triad of renal cell carcinoma (hematuria, flank pain and palpable abdominal mass; only 6-10% of patients) or even nonspecific symptoms including fatigue, weight loss, fever, and anorexia. Since early diagnosis is relatively uncommon, PRCC patients may experience symptoms caused by the metastatic spread to secondary sites. Specifically, metastasis occurs most frequently in the lungs followed by bone and the brain, exhibiting a wide range of symptoms including bone pain to a persistent cough.

== Causes ==
Currently, the exact cause of PRCC remains unclear. Possible risk factors have been identified that contribute to PRCC development, which include genetic mutations, hereditary syndrome, renal injuries, and lifestyle factors. Germline mutation of c-MET oncogene and fumarate hydratase gene elevates the risk of type 1 and type 2 PRCC respectively through distinct signaling pathways. Regarding hereditary conditions, patients with hereditary papillary renal cancer syndrome showed a greater risk of type 1 PRCC, whereas those with hereditary leiomyomatosis and renal cell cancer (HLRCC) syndrome have an increased risk of type 2 PRCC. Moreover, patients who experienced chronic kidney diseases or acute kidney injury exhibited a higher incidence of PRCC. Additionally, other risk factors such as smoking, obesity, and high blood pressure can influence the pathogenesis of PRCC.

== Pathogenesis ==
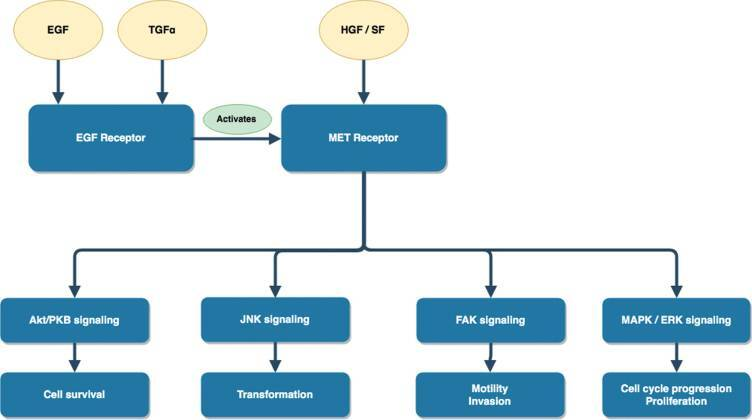
An overview of the MET molecular pathway in PRCC

Different molecular mechanisms are involved in PRCC development, which further result in distinct histologic features and clinical outcomes.

Type 1 PRCC is caused by a genetic mutation or a gain in chromosome 7 where the MET gene is positioned, resulting in the promotion of oncogenic pathways in renal epithelial cells. Typically, the MET gene is upregulated for renal tissue repair and regeneration by encoding the receptor tyrosine kinase c-MET of hepatocyte growth factor. However, activation of the oncogenic pathway in the MET gene will manifest invasion, anti-apoptosis, angiogenesis, and metastasis.

Type 2 PRCC is associated with irregularity of several signaling pathways, which includes CDKN2A silencing, mutation in chromatin-modifying genes, and a GpG island methylator phenotype (CIMP). CDKN2A is a tumor suppressor gene, while loss of its expression results in enhanced tumorigenesis and metastasis. Moreover, mutation of gene involved in chromatin remodeling (SETD2, BAP1, or PBRM) may lead to higher rate of TFE3/TFEB fusion. Additionally, CIMP papillary renal cell carcinoma tumors exhibited somatic FH gene mutation, which is closely associated with HLRCC syndrome.

== Diagnosis ==
Currently, cross-sectional imaging with computed tomography (CT) and magnetic resonance imaging (MRI) is known as the best option for diagnosing papillary renal tumors.

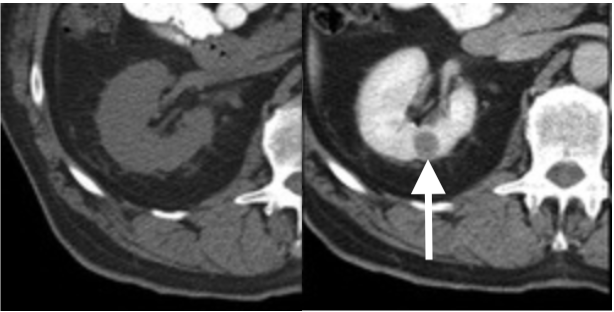
Unenhanced (left) and nephrographic phase (right) CT scans display a 1-cm low-attenuation PRCC tumor (arrow) in the right renal cortex

=== Computed tomography (CT) ===
Contrast-enhanced computed tomography (CT) is most commonly used to identify the subtypes of RCC. PRCC can be differentiated from other types of RCC due to its distinguishing features, displaying a small hypovascular renal tumor on T2 weighted images. Typically, PRCC tends to appear homogeneous while clear cell RCC is likely to be in a heterogeneous form when the tumor is less than 3 cm in diameter. Comparatively, in cases of tumors larger than 3 cm in diameter, PRCC is generally heterogeneous with areas of necrosis and hemorrhage compared to chromophobe RCC. Solid, small PRCC tumors (<3 cm in diameter) are more easily viewed on nephrographic, excretory phase images rather than on unenhanced, corticomedullary phase images.

=== Magnetic resonance imaging (MRI) ===
Magnetic resonance imaging (MRI) is recommended instead of CT for patients with an allergy to iodinated contrast materials. As some renal tumors do not enhance significantly on CT, MRI examination is required to be performed with more sensitive contrast enhancement. On MRI, the distinct features of PRCC are fibrous capsules and homogeneously low single intensity on both T1- and T2-weighted images. Specifically, PRCC exhibits hypointensity due to its dense collagenous matrix or deposition of calcium and hemosiderin within the tumor. Such visual features help PRCC to be differentiated from clear cell RCC, which has heterogeneously higher single intensity shown on T2-weighted images. PRCC displays the smallest tumor-to-cortex enhancement at corticomedullary and nephrographic phases when juxtaposed with clear cell and chromophobe RCCs.

=== Grading System ===
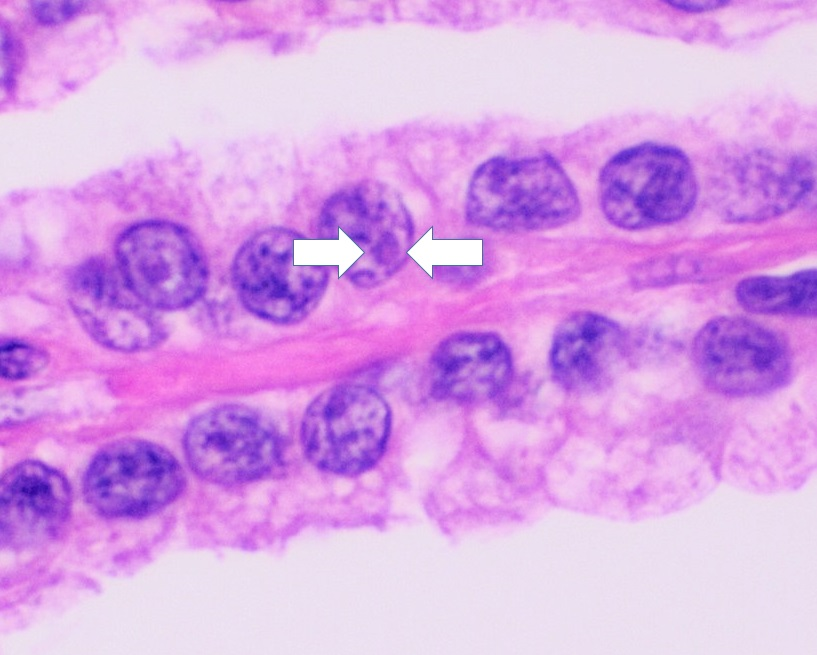
Papillary renal cell carcinoma type 1, grade 2: Nucleoli (one annotated by arrows) are conspicuous and eosinophilic at $\times$400 magnification and visible but not prominent at $\times$100 magnification.

The WHO/ISUP system is histological tumor grading system for renal cell carcinoma, suggested by the International Society of Urologic Pathologists (ISUP) in 2012 to diagnose tumor grades based on nucleolar prominence. Currently recommended by the WHO, this four-tiered WHO/ISUP grading system has also been validated for PRCC.

WHO/ISUP system for Papillary Renal Cell Carcinoma (PRCC) Grading
Grade	Definition
1	Nucleoli are absent or inconspicuous and basophilic at $\times$400 magnification.
2	Nucloeli are conspicuous and eosinophilic at $\times$400 magnification and visible but not prominent at $\times$100 magnification.
3	Nucleoli are conspicuous and eosinophilic at $\times$100 magnification
4	There is extreme nuclear pleomorphism, multinucleate giants cells, and/or rhabdoid an/or sarcomatoid differentiation

Earlier, the Fuhrman system was largely used, and was similarly based on nuclear features.

== Treatment ==
First-line treatment for metastatic PRCC has not been standardized. Thus, similar treatment approaches for clear cell RCC have been used for PRCC, even though it has a distinct tumor histology.

=== Surgery ===
Nephrectomy or nephron-sharing partial nephrectomy is widely recommended to reduce the risk of metastasis by eliminating all or part of the kidney. Surgery procedures for PRCC depend on the patient's status and are very similar to procedures performed on RCC patients.

=== Targeted Therapy ===
Several medications that target molecular pathways in RCC have been possible options for advanced and metastatic PRCC. Among different medications, tyrosine kinase inhibitors (TKIs) and mammalian target of rapamycin (mTOR) inhibitors are effective in inhibiting angiogenesis, blocking growth and suppressing spread of the tumor. Sunitinib, sorafenib, and axitinib are TKIs with anti-vascular endothelial growth factor (VEGF), which inhibit cellular signaling by targeting multiple receptor tyrosine kinase. Everolimus and temsirolimus are used in deregulating the mTOR pathway. Specifically, mTOR inhibitors have crucial roles in regulating cell growth, cell proliferation and metabolism of highly active tumor cells. Other targeted agents such as MET inhibitors, epidermal growth factor receptor (EGFR) inhibitors, and monoclonal antibodies, are also promising treatment approaches for PRCC. Foretinib is one example of a multikinase inhibitor targeting c-MET. Considering that MET gene mutation is one oncogenic pathway of PRCC, MET inhibitors like tivantinib and volitinib are currently being investigated as a new targeted therapy option.

== Prognosis ==
The five-year survival rate of PRCC has been reported as 82-90%, which is slightly higher than that of other kidney cancers. The reduced survival rate has been positively correlated to several factors, which are high nuclear grade and stage, vascular invasion, DNA aneuploidy, and more. Patients with type 1 PRCC have significantly improved survival rates than those with type 2, which is a reflection of its lower TNM stage with a well-encapsulated tumor. Compared to other common types of RCC, PRCC exhibits a relatively lower risk of tumor recurrence and cancer-related death after nephrectomy. Specifically, the cancer-specific survival rate at five years following surgery with PRCC has reached up to 91%, while clear cell RCC and chromophobe RCC were 72% and 88%, respectively.

== Epidemiology ==
Among different histologic subtypes of RCC, PRCC is the second most predominant type and accounts for 10-15% of all renal tumors. In the case of the United States, it is estimated that the incidence of PRCC will rise to 3,500 to 5,000 cases annually. Generally, PRCC is more prevalent among men than women, while the reported sex ratio (M: F) varies from 1.8:1 to 3.8:1. The mean age at presentation is identified as 52–66 years old; however, no statistically significant difference was found in the incidence of PRCC between the younger (< 40 years) and older adult groups (>40 years). In terms of racial variation, several studies have proven that people with African or Afro-Caribbean ancestry tend to have higher chances of being diagnosed with PRCC. According to the National Cancer Database, PRCC was more common in the Non-Hispanic Black population (38.9%) when compared to other races – Asian American (18.0%), Non-Hispanic White (13.2%), and Hispanic White populations (6.1%).

== See also ==
- Kidney cancer
- Chemotherapy
- Sarcomatoid carcinoma and Renal cell carcinoma (RCC)
