= Hobnailing (histology) =

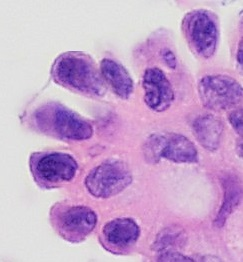
Histopathology of ovarian serous borderline tumor with hobnailing

In histopathology, hobnailing is the presence of smooth projections from an epithelial surface, which generally contain nuclei. Hobnailing is seen in clear cell ovarian adenocarcinoma, collecting duct carcinoma, and in end-stage cirrhosis.
