= Clear cell papillary renal cell carcinoma =

Clear cell papillary renal cell tumour
- Other names: Clear cell tubulopapillary renal cell carcinoma
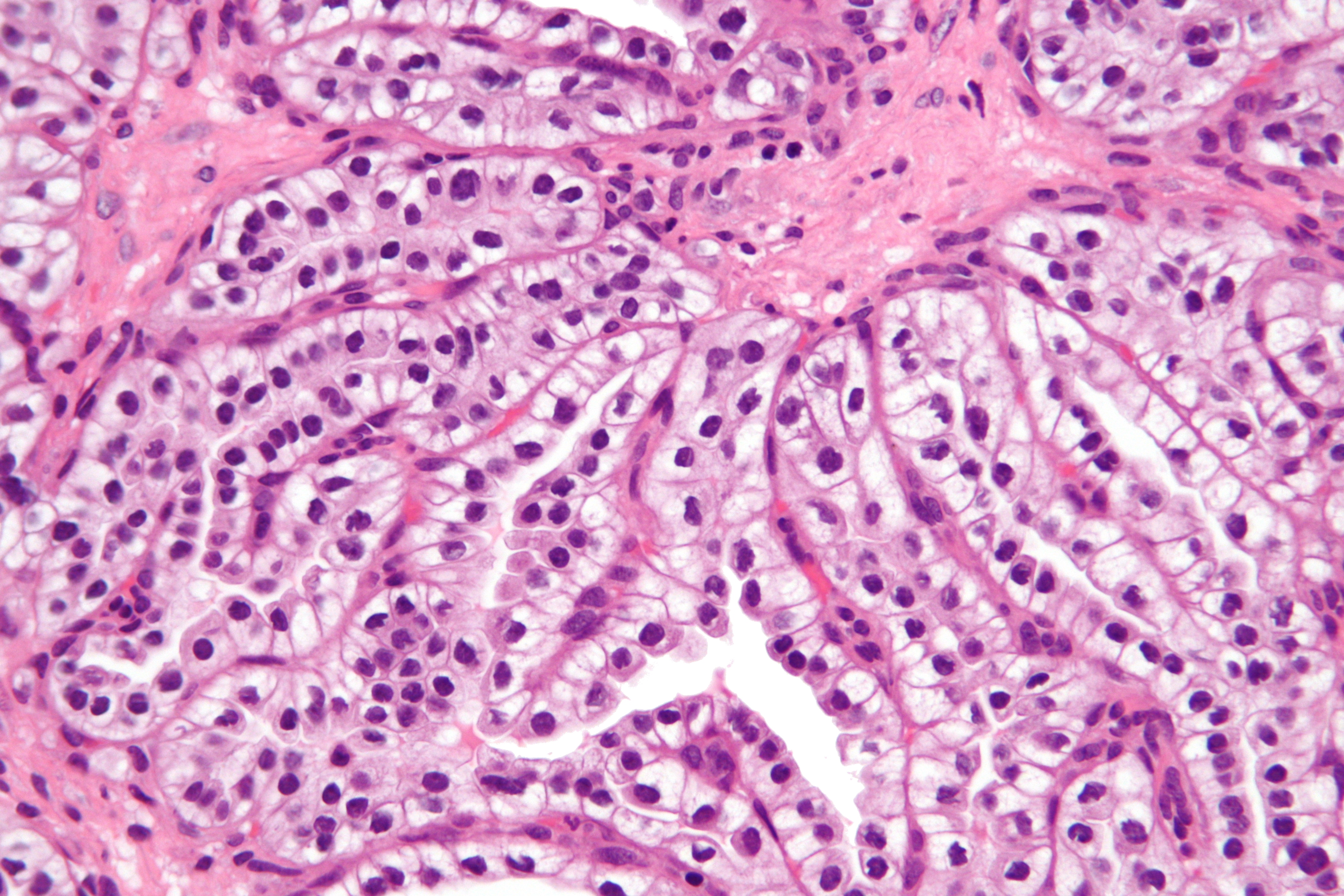
- Micrograph of a clear cell papillary renal cell tumour showing the characteristic apically located nuclei. H&E stain.
- Specialty: Oncology. nephrology

Clear cell papillary renal cell tumour (CCPRCT) is a rare subtype of renal cell carcinoma (RCC) that has microscopic morphologic features of papillary renal cell carcinoma and clear cell renal cell carcinoma, yet is pathologically distinct based on molecular changes and immunohistochemistry.

== Pathology ==
CCPRCT classically has apical nuclei, i.e. the nucleus is adjacent to the luminal aspect. In most glandular structures the nuclei are usually basally located, i.e. in the cytoplasm adjacent to the basement membrane.

They typically stain with CK7 with 'cuplike' staining for CAIX, and do not stain with TFE3 and AMACR.

== See also ==
- Renal cancer
- Renal cell carcinoma
