= Multilocular cystic renal cell carcinoma =

- Specialty: Oncology/nephrology

Multilocular cystic renal cell carcinoma (MCRCC) is rare subtype of renal cell carcinoma. Histologically, the tumor has a fibrous capsule and contains multiple cysts with clear cells.

1-5% of renal cell carcinomas are MCRCC.
