= Acquired cystic kidney disease-associated renal cell carcinoma =

- Specialty: Nephrology/oncology

Acquired cystic kidney disease-associated renal cell carcinoma is rare subtype of renal cell carcinoma. It is most commonly seen in people with end-stage kidney disease who have a much higher risk of developing acquired cystic kidney disease (ACKD). Affected individuals have small kidneys with several cysts and their risk of renal cell carcinoma is 30 times higher than people without ACKD.

Bloody urine and flank pain in a person with end-stage kidney disease raise suspicion for ACKD-associated renal cell carcinoma. Although people with ACKD have a substantially higher risk of renal cell carcinoma, routine screening is not recommended. ACKD-associated renal cell carcinoma is an uncommon cause of death for people with end-stage kidney disease.
