= Renal cell carcinoma with t(6;11) translocation =

- Specialty: Oncology/nephrology

Renal cell carcinoma with t(6;11) translocation or TFEB-amplified Renal Cell Carcinomas is rare subtype of renal cell carcinoma. The t(6;11)(p21;q12) translocation fuses the Alpha (MALAT1) gene with the TFEB transcription factor gene, resulting in upregulated expression of TFEB which leads to expression of melanocytic markers.
