= Thyroid-like follicular renal cell carcinoma =

- Specialty: Oncology/nephrology

Thyroid-like follicular renal cell carcinoma is rare subtype of renal cell carcinoma.
