= Hybrid oncocytoma/chromophobe renal cell carcinoma =

- Specialty: Oncology/Nephrology

Hybrid oncocytoma/chromophobe renal cell carcinoma is rare subtype of renal cell carcinoma. It arises from intercalated cells of cortical collecting ducts of the kidney. It is associated with extreme hypodiploidy with multiple losses of entire chromosomes 1, 2, 6, 10, 13, 17, 21 and Y.
