= Renal collecting duct carcinoma =

Type of kidney cancer

Collecting duct carcinoma
- Other names: Bellini duct carcinoma
- Collecting duct carcinoma. H&E stain.
- Specialty: Oncology/nephrology

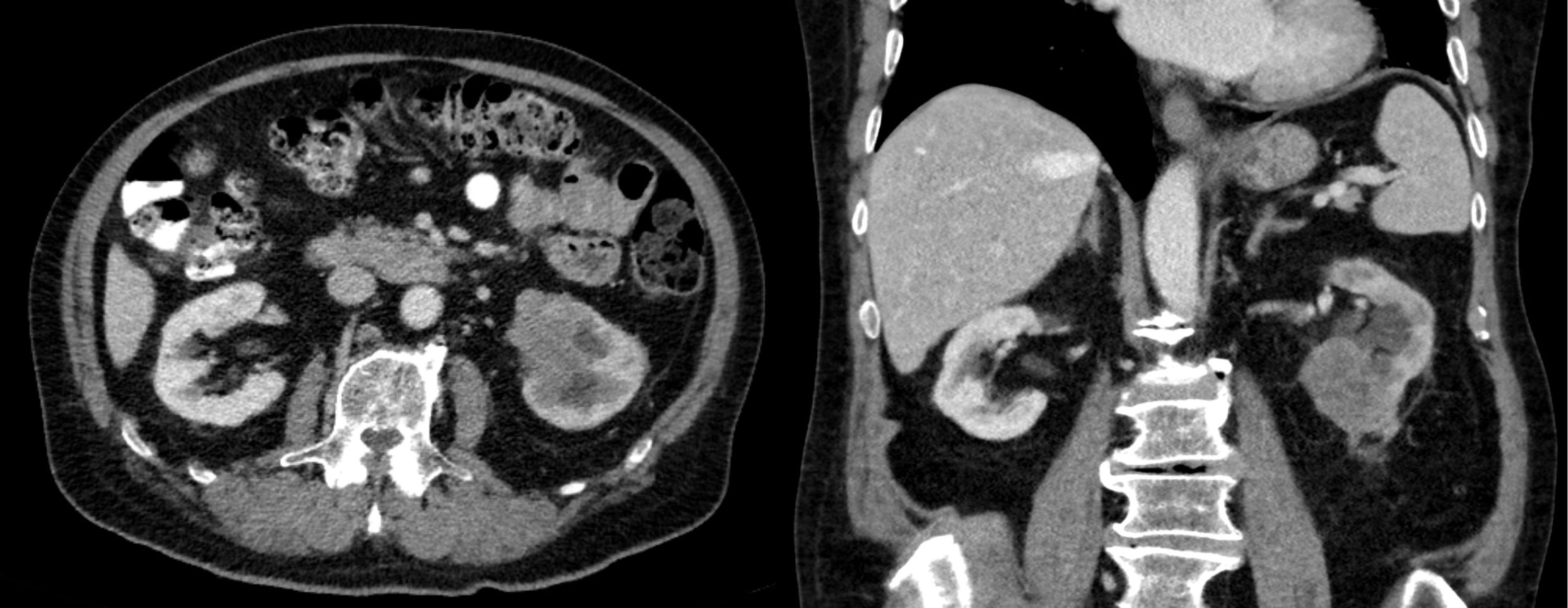
Collecting duct carcinoma in computed tomography

Collecting duct carcinoma (CDC) is a type of kidney cancer that originates in the papillary duct of the kidney. It is rare, accounting for 1-3% of all kidney cancers. It is also recently described; a 2002 review found just 40 case reports worldwide. Previously, due to its location, CDC was commonly diagnosed as renal cell carcinoma or a subtype of renal cell carcinoma. However, CDC does not respond well to chemotherapy drugs used for renal cell carcinoma, and progresses and spreads more quickly.

== Signs and symptoms ==
Signs and symptoms are as for kidney cancer.

== Histology ==
Histologic examination of collecting duct carcinoma demonstrates an infiltrative lesion with tubulopapillary, irregular channels lined by high grade hobnail cells with marked desmoplastic response and brisk neutrophilic infiltrate.

== History ==
CDC was thought to be renal cell carcinoma, until "recently developed techniques of lectin histochemistry" helped forward knowledge of kidney duct cancers.

== See also ==
- Chemotherapy
- Renal cell carcinoma, clear cell renal carcinoma, types of kidney cancer
- Surface epithelial-stromal tumor (a type of ovarian cancer which affects the epithelial cells
