= Lorenzo Bellini =

Italian physician and anatomist (1643–1704)

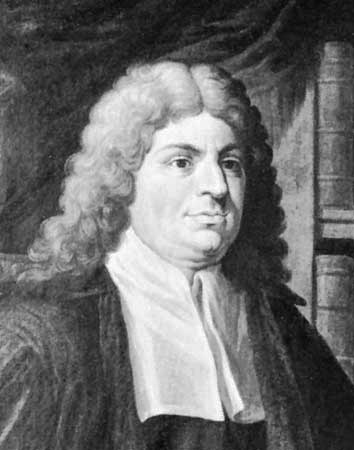
- Lorenzo Bellini
- Born: 3 September 1643; Florence
- Died: 8 January 1704 (aged 60); Florence
- Scientific career
- Fields: anatomy

Lorenzo Bellini (3 September 1643 in Florence – 8 January 1704 in Florence), Italian physician and anatomist.

== Life ==
At the age of twenty, when he had already begun his researches on the structure of the kidneys and had described the papillary ducts (also known as Bellini's ducts; Latin: ductus Bellini, tubulus Bellini, tubuli Belliniani; see: duct of Bellini, Bellini duct carcinoma), as published in his book Exercitatio Anatomica de Structura Usu Renum (1662), he was chosen professor of theoretical medicine at Pisa, but soon after was transferred to the chair of anatomy. After spending thirty years at Pisa, he was invited to Florence and appointed physician to the grand duke Cosimo III, and was also made senior consulting physician to Pope Clement XI. His works were published in a collected form at Venice in 1708.

== Gallery ==
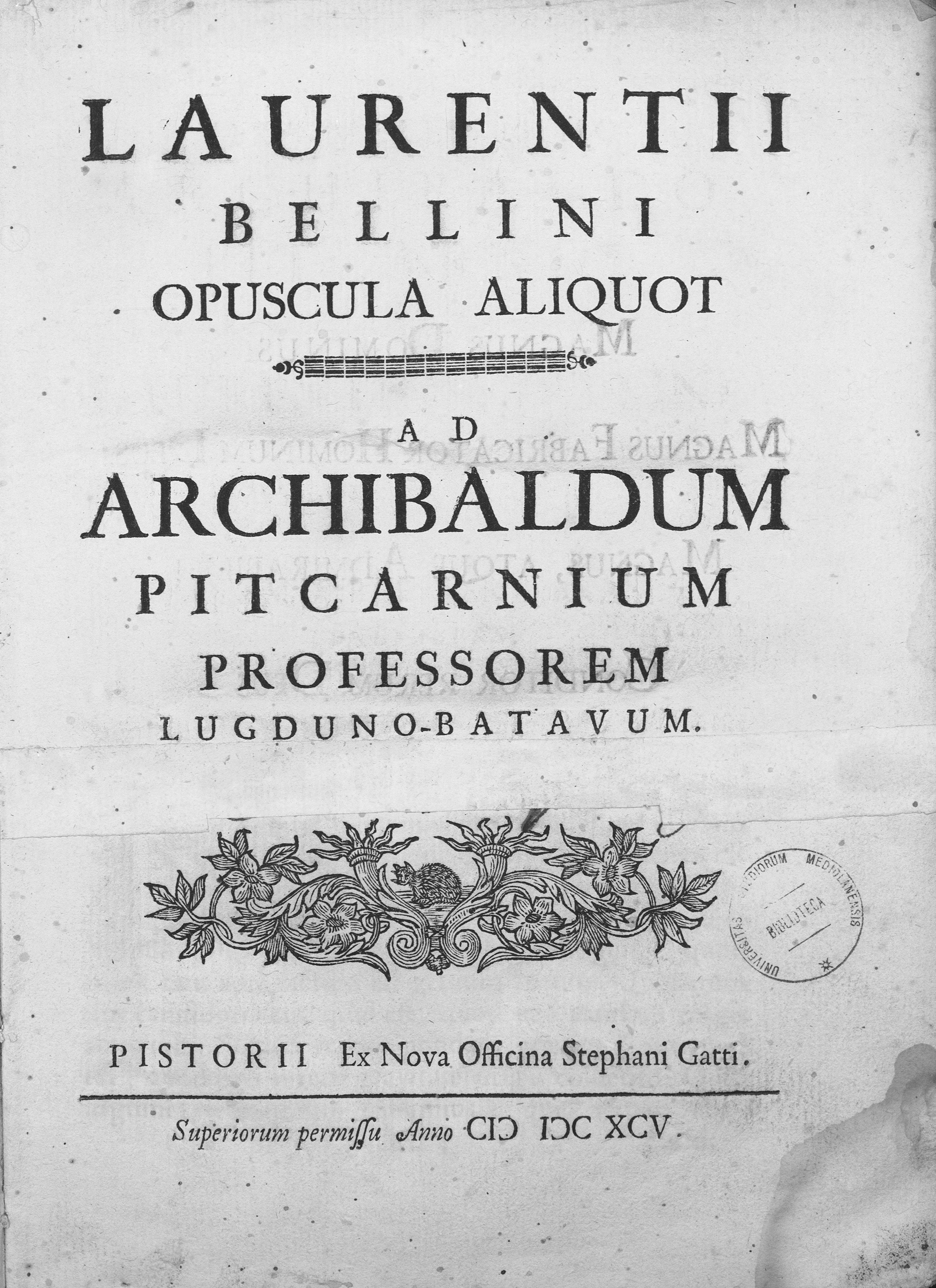
Opuscula, 1695

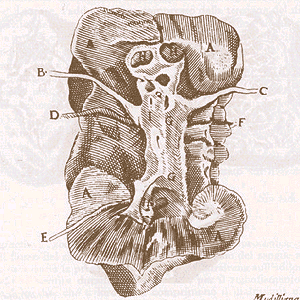
Drawing of kidney ducts by Lorenzo Bellini.

== Sources ==
- Fye, W B (February 1997). "Lorenzo Bellini". Clinical Cardiology. 20 (2): 181–182. doi:10.1002/clc.4960200218. PMC 6656224. PMID 9034650.
- Klass, G M (December 1974). Bellini's concept of catarrh: an examination of a seventeenth-century iatromechanical viewpoint. Clio Medica (Amsterdam, Netherlands). Vol. 9. pp. 317–323. PMID 4141293.
- Lilien, O M (May 1971). "Marcello Malpighi (1628–1694) and Lorenzo Bellini (1643–1704)". Investigative Urology. 8 (6): 698–699. PMID 4931080.
