= Tubulocystic renal cell carcinoma =

- Specialty: Nephrology/oncology

Tubulocystic renal cell carcinoma is rare subtype of renal cell carcinoma.
