= PBRM1 =

Protein-coding gene in the species Homo sapiens

Identifiers
- Aliases: PBRM1, BAF180, PB1, polybromo 1, SMARCH1, RCC
- External IDs: OMIM: 606083; MGI: 1923998; GeneCards: PBRM1
Available structures
PDB	Ortholog search: PDBe RCSB
PDB	List of PDB id codes 3G0J, 3HMF, 3IU5, 3IU6, 3K2J, 3LJW, 3MB4, 3TLP, 4Q0N, 4Q0O, 4Y03, 5IID, 5FH7, 5II1, 5II2, 5FH6, 5FH8

Gene location (Human)
Chr.	Chromosome 3 (human)
Band	3p21.1	Start	52,545,352 bp
Band	3p21.1	End	52,685,917 bp

Gene location (Mouse)
Chr.	Chromosome 14 (mouse)
Band	14|14 B	Start	30,741,095 bp
Band	14|14 B	End	30,843,549 bp
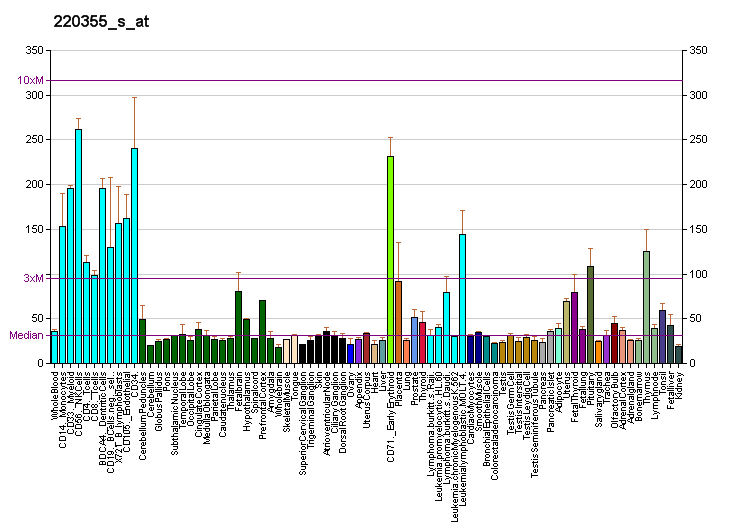
RNA expression pattern
Bgee	Human / Mouse (ortholog); Top expressed in: ganglionic eminence; amniotic fluid; sural nerve; human penis; saphenous vein; Achilles tendon; mucosa of paranasal sinus; thymus; epithelium of nasopharynx; germinal epithelium / Top expressed in: Rostral migratory stream; Gonadal ridge; renal corpuscle; medullary collecting duct; maxillary prominence; atrium; saccule; mandibular prominence; atrioventricular junction; primitive streak; More reference expression data
BioGPS	More reference expression data
Gene ontology
Molecular function	DNA binding; chromatin binding; protein binding; DNA translocase activity
Cellular component	nuclear chromosome; nucleus; nucleoplasm; RSC-type complex
Biological process	regulation of transcription, DNA-templated; transcription, DNA-templated; negative regulation of cell population proliferation; mitotic cell cycle; chromatin remodeling; chromatin organization; nucleosome disassembly; transcription elongation from RNA polymerase II promoter
Sources:Amigo / QuickGO
Orthologs
Databases	NCBI: entry; OMA: entry
Species	Human	Mouse
Entrez	55193	66923
Ensembl	ENSG00000163939	ENSMUSG00000042323
UniProt	Q86U86	Q8BSQ9
RefSeq (mRNA)	NM_018165; NM_018313; NM_181041; NM_181042; NM_001350074 NM_001350075; NM_001350076; NM_001350077; NM_001350078; NM_001350079; NM_001366070; NM_001366071; NM_001366072; NM_001366073; NM_001366074; NM_001366075; NM_001366076; NM_001394867; NM_001394868; NM_001394869; NM_001394870; NM_001394871; NM_001394872; NM_001394873; NM_001394874; NM_001394875; NM_001394877; NM_001394878; NM_001394879; NM_001394880; NM_001394881; NM_001394876; NM_001400470; NM_001400471; NM_001400472; NM_001400473; NM_001400474; NM_001400475; NM_001400479; NM_001400481; NM_001400484; NM_001400487; NM_001400490; NM_001400496; NM_001400500; NM_001400501; NM_001400504	NM_001081251; NM_025847; NM_001359854; NM_001359855; NM_001359856 NM_001359857; NM_001359858
RefSeq (protein)	NP_060783; NP_851385; NP_001337003; NP_001337004; NP_001337005 NP_001337006; NP_001337007; NP_001337008; NP_001352999; NP_001353000; NP_001353001; NP_001353002; NP_001353003; NP_001353004; NP_001353005	NP_001074720; NP_001346783; NP_001346784; NP_001346785; NP_001346786 NP_001346787
Location (UCSC)	Chr 3: 52.55 – 52.69 Mb	Chr 14: 30.74 – 30.84 Mb
PubMed search
- Wikidata
View/Edit Human	View/Edit Mouse

Protein polybromo-1 (PB1) also known as BRG1-associated factor 180 (BAF180) is a protein that in humans is encoded by the PBRM1 gene.

== Structure and function ==
Human PBRM1 is one of three unique components of the SWI/SNF-B (PBAF) chromatin-remodeling complex, which contains at least SMARCA4/BRG1, SMARCB1/SNF5/INI1/BAF47, ACTL6A/BAF53A or ACTL6B/BAF53B, SMARCE1/BAF57, SMARCD1/BAF60A, SMARCD2/BAF60B, and actin.

Chicken PB1 possesses 5 bromodomains, 2 bromo-adjacent homology (BAH) domains, and 1 truncated high-mobility group (HMG) motif. cPB1 is also homologous to yeast Rsc1, Rsc2, and Rsc4, essential proteins that are required for cell cycle progression through mitosis.

== Clinical significance ==
PBRM1 is thought to be a tumor suppressor gene in many cancer subtypes largely due to the mutational pattern. Most notably, mutations and copy number alterations in PBRM1 are highly prevalent in clear cell renal cell carcinoma (ccRCC).

=== Role in renal carcinoma ===
Loss of function mutations in PBRM1 often co-occur with loss of function mutations in the VHL gene in clear cell renal cell carcinoma (ccRCC). The inactivation of PBRM1 in combination with biallelic loss of VHL has been shown to potentiate HIF1α signaling and activate the pro-tumorigenic NF-κB pathway. Genetic loss of PBRM1 is thought to underlie the early initiation of ccRCC due to the sufficiency of conditional deletion of Pbrm1 and Vhl for renal carcinomagenesis in mice. While several studies have identified a favorable outcomes among advanced ccRCC cases with PBRM1 mutations when treated with immune checkpoint inhibitors, there is still debate about the utility of PBRM1 status as a biomarker for response to ICI therapy.
