= Collecting duct system =

Kidney system

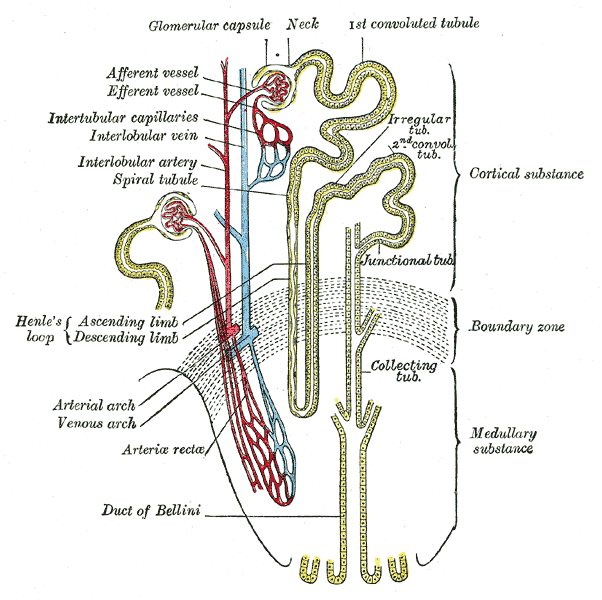
- Scheme of renal tubule and its vascular supply.

Details
- Location: Kidney

Identifiers
- Latin: tubulus renalis colligens
- MeSH: D007685
- FMA: 265239

The collecting duct system of the kidney consists of a series of tubules and ducts that physically connect nephrons to a minor calyx or directly to the renal pelvis. The collecting duct participates in electrolyte and fluid balance through reabsorption and excretion, processes regulated by the hormones aldosterone and vasopressin (antidiuretic hormone).

There are several components of the collecting duct system, including the connecting tubules, cortical collecting ducts, and medullary collecting ducts.

== Structure ==
=== Segments ===
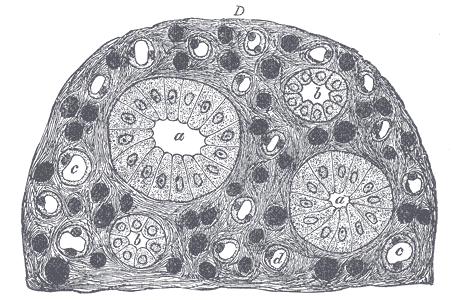
Simple columnar epithelium and simple cuboidal epithelium in the collecting ducts of the pig kidney. The walls of the large and small connecting tubules (a and b respectively), the circular structures, are formed by simple columnar epithelium (a) and simple cuboidal epithelium (b).

The segments of the system are as follows:

Segment	Description
connecting tubule	Connects distal convoluted tubule to the cortical collecting duct
initial collecting tubule	Before convergence of nephrons
cortical collecting ducts	Receives filtrate from the initial collecting tubules, and descends into the renal medulla, forming medullary collecting ducts
medullary collecting ducts	
papillary ducts	

==== Connecting tubule ====
With respect to the renal corpuscle, the connecting tubule (CNT, or junctional tubule, or arcuate renal tubule) is the most proximal part of the collecting duct system. It is adjacent to the distal convoluted tubule, the most distal segment of the renal tubule. Connecting tubules from several adjacent nephrons merge to form cortical collecting tubules, and these may join to form cortical collecting ducts (CCD). Connecting tubules of some juxtamedullary nephrons may arch upward, forming an arcade. It is this "arcuate" feature which gives the tubule its alternate name.

The connecting tubule derives from the metanephric blastema, but the rest of the system derives from the ureteric bud. Because of this, some sources group the connecting tubule as part of the nephron, rather than grouping it with the collecting duct system.

The initial collecting tubule is a segment with a constitution similar as the collecting duct, but before the convergence with other tubules.

The "cortical collecting ducts" receive filtrate from multiple initial collecting tubules and descend into the renal medulla to form medullary collecting ducts.

It participates in the regulation of water and electrolytes, including sodium, and chloride. The CNT is sensitive to both isoprotenerol (more so than the cortical collecting ducts) and antidiuretic hormone (less so than the cortical collecting ducts), the latter largely determining its function in water reabsorption.

==== Medullary collecting duct ====
"Medullary collecting ducts" are divided into outer and inner segments, the latter reaching more deeply into the medulla. The variable reabsorption of water and, depending on fluid balances and hormonal influences, the reabsorption or secretion of sodium, potassium, hydrogen and bicarbonate ion continues here. Urea passively transports out of duct here and creates 500mOsm gradient.

The outer segment of the medullary collecting duct follows the cortical collecting duct. It reaches the level of the renal medulla where the thin descending limb of loop of Henle borders with the thick ascending limb of loop of Henle

The inner segment is the part of the collecting duct system between the outer segment and the papillary ducts.

==== Papillary duct ====
Papillary (collecting) ducts are anatomical structures of the kidneys, previously known as the ducts of Bellini. Papillary ducts represent the most distal portion of the collecting duct. They receive renal filtrate (precursor to urine) from several medullary collecting ducts and empty into a minor calyx. Papillary ducts continue the work of water reabsorption and electrolyte balance initiated in the collecting tubules.

Medullary collecting ducts converge to form a central (papillary) duct near the apex of each renal pyramid. This "papillary duct" exits the renal pyramid at the renal papillae. The renal filtrate it carries drains into a minor calyx as urine.

The cells that comprise the duct itself are similar to rest of the collecting system. The duct is lined by a layer of simple columnar epithelium resting on a thin basement membrane. The epithelium is composed primarily of principal cells and α-intercalated cells. The simple columnar epithelium of the collecting duct system transitions into urothelium near the junction of a papillary duct and a minor calyx.

These cells work in tandem to reabsorb water, sodium, and urea and secrete acid and potassium. The amount of reabsorption or secretion that occurs is related to needs of the body at any given time. These processes are mediated by hormones (aldosterone, vasopressin) and the osmolarity (concentration of electrically charged chemicals) of the surrounding medulla. Hormones regulate how permeable the papillary duct is to water and electrolytes. In the medullary collecting duct specifically, vasopressin upregulates urea transporter A1. This increases the concentration of urea in the surrounding interstitium and increases the osmolarity. Osmolarity influences the strength of the force that pulls (reabsorbs) water from the papillary duct into the medullary interstitium. This is especially important in the papillary ducts. Osmolarity increases from the base of the renal pyramid to the apex. It is highest at the renal apex (up to 1200 mOsm). Thus the force driving the reabsorption of water from the collecting system is the greatest in the papillary duct.

=== Cells ===
Each component of the collecting duct system contains two cell types, intercalated cells and a segment-specific cell type:

- For the connecting tubules, this specific cell type is the connecting tubule cell
- For the collecting ducts, it is the principal cell. The inner medullary collecting ducts contain an additional cell type, called the inner medullary collecting duct cell.

==== Principal cells ====
The principal cell mediates the collecting duct's influence on sodium and potassium balance via sodium channels and potassium channels located on the cell's apical membrane. Aldosterone determines expression of sodium channels (especially the ENaC on the collecting tubule). Increases in aldosterone increase expression of luminal sodium channels. Aldosterone also increases the number of Na⁺/K⁺-ATPase pumps that allow increased sodium reabsorption and potassium excretion. Vasopressin determines the expression of aquaporin channels that provide a physical pathway for water to pass through the principal cells. Together, aldosterone and vasopressin let the principal cell control the quantity of water that is reabsorbed.

==== Intercalated cells ====
Image depicting an α intercalated cell

Intercalated cells come in α, β, and non-α non-β varieties and participate in acid–base homeostasis.

Type of cell	Secretes	Reabsorbs
α-intercalated cells	acid (via an apical H^{+}-ATPase and H^{+}/K^{+} exchanger) in the form of hydrogen ions	bicarbonate (via band 3, a basolateral Cl^{−}/HCO_{3}^{−} exchanger)
β-intercalated cells	bicarbonate (via pendrin a specialised apical Cl^{−}/HCO_{3}^{−})	acid (via a basal H^{+}-ATPase)
non-α non-β intercalated cells	acid (via an apical H^{+}-ATPase and H^{+}/K^{+} exchanger) and bicarbonate (via pendrin)	-

For their contribution to acid–base homeostasis, the intercalated cells play important roles in the kidney's response to acidosis and alkalosis. Damage to the α-intercalated cell's ability to secrete acid can result in distal renal tubular acidosis (RTA type I, classical RTA)(reference). The intercalated cell population is also extensively modified in response to chronic lithium treatment, including the addition of a largely uncharacterized cell type which expressed markers for both intercalated and principal cells.

== Function ==
Diagram outlining movement of ions in nephron, with the collecting ducts on the right.

The collecting duct system is the final component of the kidney to influence the body's electrolyte and fluid balance. In humans, the system accounts for 4–5% of the kidney's reabsorption of sodium and 5% of the kidney's reabsorption of water. At times of extreme dehydration, over 24% of the filtered water may be reabsorbed in the collecting duct system.

The wide variation in water reabsorption levels for the collecting duct system reflects its dependence on hormonal activation. The collecting ducts, in particular, the outer medullary and cortical collecting ducts, are largely impermeable to water without the presence of antidiuretic hormone (ADH, or vasopressin).

- In the absence of ADH, water in the renal filtrate is left alone to enter the urine, promoting diuresis.
- When ADH is present, aquaporins allow for the reabsorption of this water, thereby inhibiting diuresis.

The collecting duct system participates in the regulation of other electrolytes, including chloride, potassium, hydrogen ions, and bicarbonate.

An extracellular protein called hensin (protein) mediates the regulation of secretion of acid by alpha cells in acidosis, and secretion of bicarbonate by beta cells in alkalosis.

== Collecting duct carcinoma ==
Carcinoma of the collecting duct is a relatively rare subtype of renal cell carcinoma (RCC), accounting for less than 1% of all RCCs. Many reported cases have occurred in younger patients, often in the third, fourth, or fifth decade of life. Collecting duct carcinomas are derived from the medulla, but many are infiltrative, and extension into the cortex is common. Most reported cases have been high grade and advanced stage and have not responded to conventional therapies. Most patients are symptomatic at presentation. Immunohistochemical and molecular analyses suggest that collecting duct RCC may resemble transitional cell carcinoma, and some patients with advanced collecting duct RCC have responded to cisplatin- or gemcitabine-based chemotherapy.

== See also ==
- Collecting duct carcinoma
- List of distinct cell types in the adult human body
