= Savolitinib =

Chemical compound

Clinical data
- Other names: Volitinib
- ATC code: L01EP03 (WHO)

Identifiers
- IUPAC name: 3-[(1S)-1-Imidazo[1,2-a]pyridin-6-ylethyl]-5-(1-methylpyrazol-4-yl)triazolo[4,5-b]pyrazine
- CAS Number: 1313725-88-0
- ChemSpider: 34501055
- UNII: 2A2DA6857R
- KEGG: D11139
- ChEBI: CHEBI:231369
- CompTox Dashboard (EPA): DTXSID801111016
- ECHA InfoCard: 100.238.920

Chemical and physical data
- Formula: C_{17}H_{15}N_{9}
- Molar mass: 345.370 g·mol^{−1}
- 3D model (JSmol): Interactive image
- SMILES: C[C@@H](c1ccc2nccn2c1)n1nnc2ncc(-c3cnn(C)c3)nc21
- InChI: InChI=1S/C17H15N9/c1-11(12-3-4-15-18-5-6-25(15)10-12)26-17-16(22-23-26)19-8-14(21-17)13-7-20-24(2)9-13/h3-11H,1-2H3/t11-/m0/s1; Key:XYDNMOZJKOGZLS-NSHDSACASA-N

Savolitinib is an experimental small molecule inhibitor of c-Met. It is being investigated for the treatment of cancer by AstraZeneca. It is in phase II clinical trials for adenocarcinoma, non-small cell lung cancer, and renal cell carcinoma. It has been given conditional approval for these indication in China.
