= Ieramilimab =

Monoclonal antibody
- Type: ?

Clinical data
- Other names: LAG525

Identifiers
- CAS Number: 2137049-37-5
- UNII: OI8P0SFD4R
- KEGG: D12156

Ieramilimab (development code LAG525) is a monoclonal antibody being developed by Novartis for the treatment of cancer. The antibody targets the immune checkpoint LAG-3, which is expressed on T cells and tends to down-regulate an immune response. In a June 2015 presentation Novartis management indicated that 'dosing is imminent' for the first clinical trials of LAG525.

Ieramilimab's first clinical trial is a Phase I in patients with various solid tumors, in combination with spartalizumab (PDR001), an anti-PD-1 monoclonal antibody has been completed. Recruiting for a phase 2 study in combination with spartalizumab for the treatment of metastatic melanoma is underway.
