= Clear cell renal cell carcinoma =

Type of kidney cancer

Clear-cell renal-cell carcinoma (ccRCC or CCRCC) is a type of renal-cell carcinoma. It is the most common form of kidney cancer in adults, accounting for an estimated 80% of all renal cell carcinomas.

== Genetics ==
=== Cytogenetics ===
- Alterations of chromosome 3p segments occurs in 70–90% of CCRCCs
- Inactivation of von Hippel–Lindau disease (VHL) gene by gene mutation and promoter hypermethylation
- Gain of chromosome 5q
- Loss of chromosomes 8p, 9p, and 14q

=== Molecular genetics ===
Several frequently mutated genes were discovered in CCRCC: VHL, KDM6A/UTX, SETD2, KDM5C/JARID1C and MLL2. PBRM1 is also commonly mutated in CCRCC.

== Histogenesis ==
CCRCC is derived from the proximal convoluted tubule.

== Microscopy ==
Generally, the cells have a clear cytoplasm, are surrounded by a distinct cell membrane and contain round and uniform nuclei.

Microscopically, CCRCCs are graded by the ISUP/WHO as follows:

- Grade 1: Inconspicuous and basophilic nucleoli at magnification of 400 times
- Grade 2: Clearly visible and eosinophilic nucleoli at magnification of 400 times
- Grade 3: Clearly visible nucleoli at magnification of 100 times
- Grade 4: Extreme pleomorphism or rhabdoid and/or sarcomatoid morphology

== Epidemiology ==
- CCRCC most commonly affects male patients in their sixties and seventies.
- The majority of cases arise sporadically.
- Only 2–4% of cases present as part of an inherited cancer syndrome, such as von Hippel–Lindau disease.

== Images ==
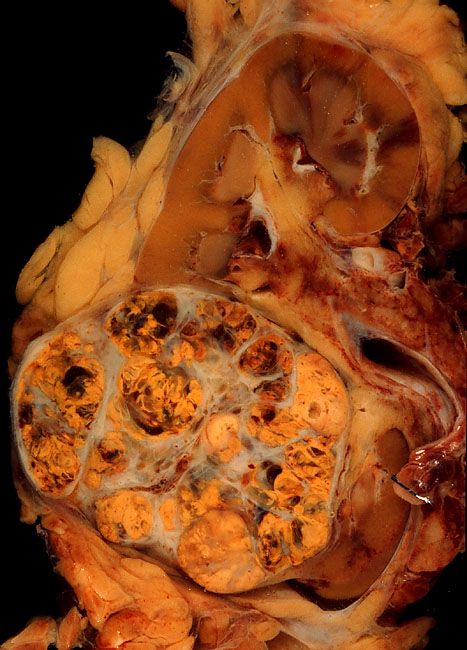
Clear-cell renal-cell carcinoma. Macroscopy

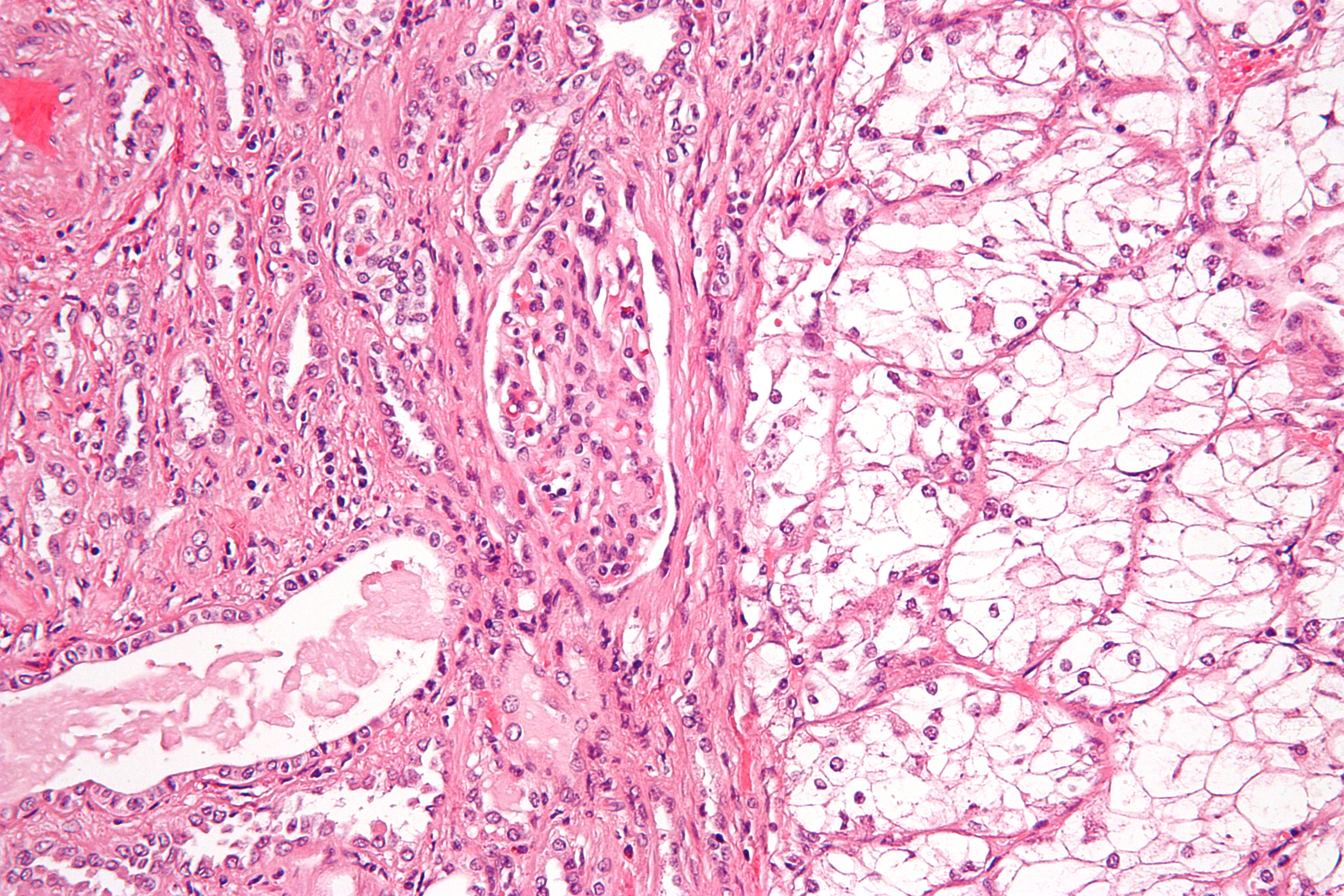
Clear-cell renal-cell carcinoma. HE, × 100

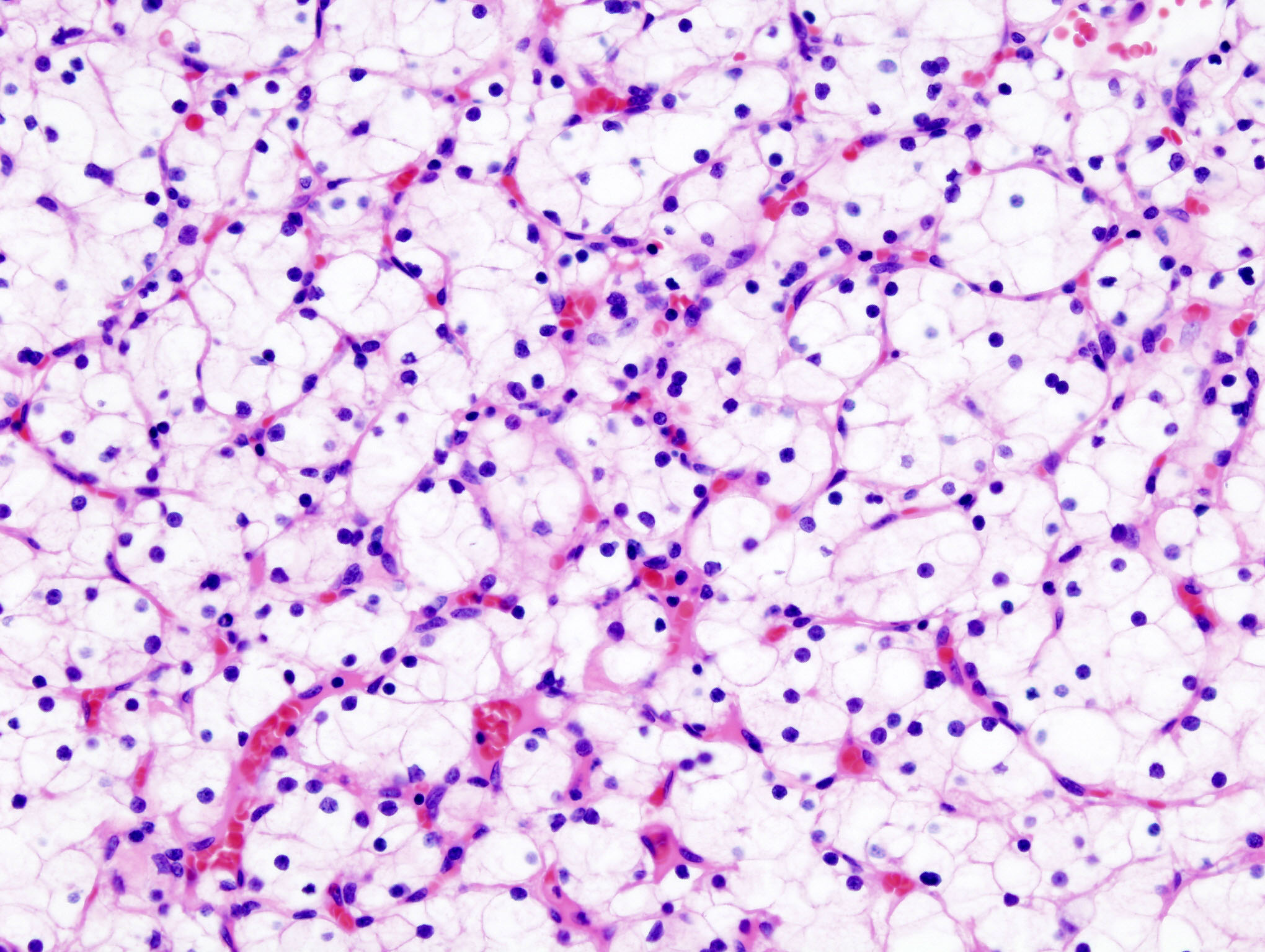
Clear-cell renal-cell carcinoma. Fuhrman grade = 1. HE, × 400

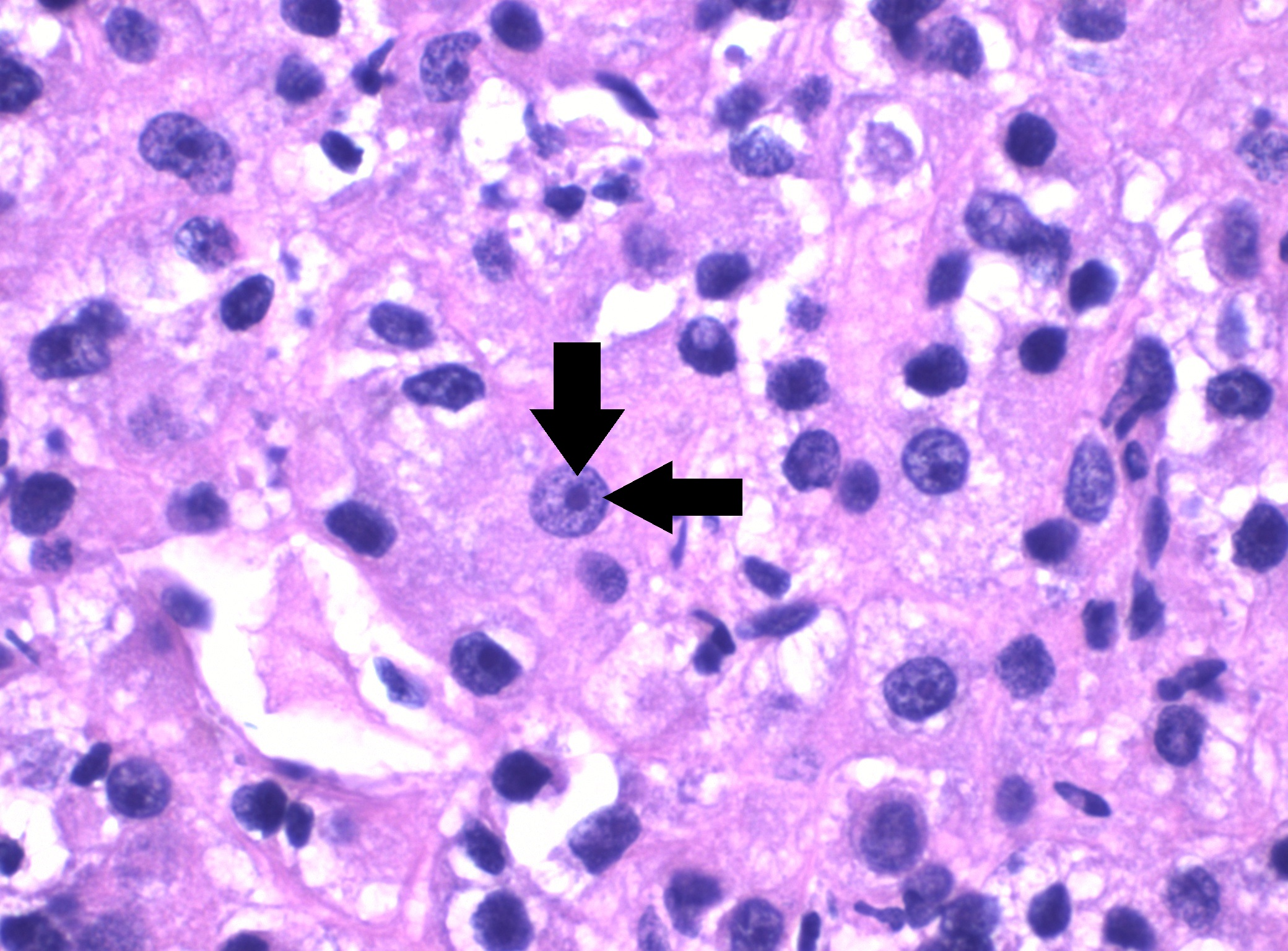
Grade 3: Arrows point at a clearly visible nucleolus.

== See also ==
- Sarcomatoid renal cell carcinoma (renal cell carcinoma)
- Chemotherapy
- Metastasis (spread of cancer)
