= Brain metastasis =

Cancer that has metastasized (spread) to the brain from another location in the body

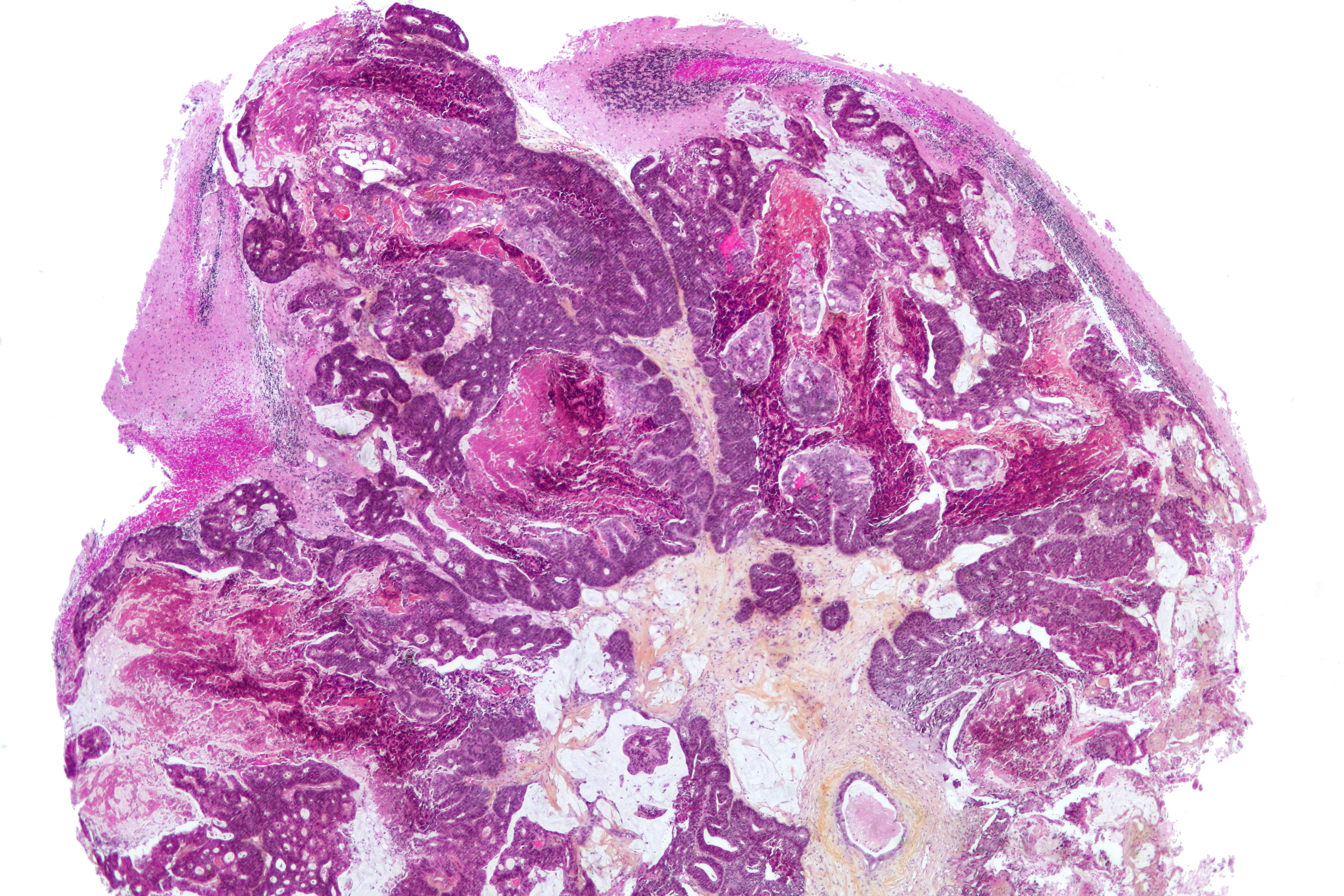
Micrograph showing a colorectal carcinoma metastasis to the cerebellum. HPS stain.

A brain metastasis is a cancer that has metastasized (spread) to the brain from another location in the body and is therefore considered a secondary brain tumor. The metastasis typically shares a cancer cell type with the original site of the cancer. Metastasis is the most common cause of brain cancer, as primary tumors that originate in the brain are less common. The most common sites of primary cancer which metastasize to the brain are lung, breast, colon, kidney, and skin cancer. Brain metastases can occur months or even years after the original or primary cancer is treated. Brain metastases have a poor prognosis for cure, but modern treatments allow patients to live months and sometimes years after the diagnosis.

== Symptoms and signs ==
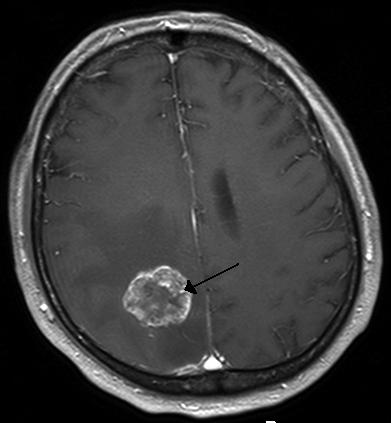
Brain metastasis in the right cerebral hemisphere from lung cancer shown on T1-weighted magnetic resonance imaging with intravenous contrast.

Because different parts of the brain are responsible for different functions, symptoms vary depending on the site of metastasis within the brain. However, brain metastases should be considered in any cancer patient who presents with neurological or behavioral changes.

Brain metastases can cause a wide variety of symptoms which can also be present in minor, more common conditions. Neurological symptoms are often caused by increased intracranial pressure, with severe cases resulting in coma. The most common neurological symptoms include:

- New onset headaches: headaches occur in roughly half of brain metastasis patients, especially in those with many tumors.
- Paresthesias: patients often present with (hemiparesis), or weakness on only one side of the body, which is often a result of damage to neighboring brain tissue.
- Ataxia: when metastasis occurs to the cerebellum, patients will experience various difficulties with spatial awareness and coordination.
- Seizures: when present, often indicates disease involvement of the cerebral cortex.

== Causes ==
The most common primary tumors causing brain metastases are, in order of decreasing frequency: Lung, breast, kidney, gastrointestinal, and melanoma. Lung and breast cancers account for over half of brain metastases.

The most common sources of brain metastases in a case series of 2,700 patients undergoing treatment at the Memorial Sloan–Kettering Cancer Center were:

- Lung cancer, 48%
- Breast cancer, 15%
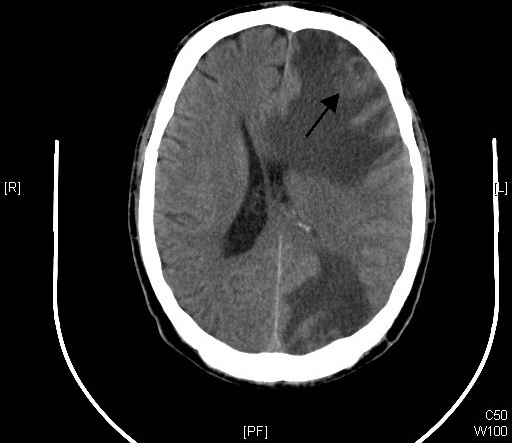
  Brain - CT scan - Metastatic Pulmonary Adenocarcinoma. Arrow points to extensive edema of frontal lobe due to 23mm mass. Second area of edema can be seen in the left parietal-occipital region.
- Genitourinary tract cancers, 11%
- Osteosarcoma, 10%
- Melanoma, 9%
- Head and neck cancer, 6%
- Neuroblastoma, 5%
- Gastrointestinal cancers, especially colorectal and pancreatic carcinoma, 3%
- Lymphoma, 1%

Lung cancer and melanoma are most likely to present with multiple metastasis, whereas breast, colon, and renal cancers are more likely to present with a single metastasis.

== Pathophysiology ==
Metastatic spread to the brain is usually hematogenous. Metastatic cells often lodge at the interface between gray mater and white mater as arteries narrow in caliber at this site. Spread to the meninges may result in leptomeningeal cancer.

== Diagnosis ==
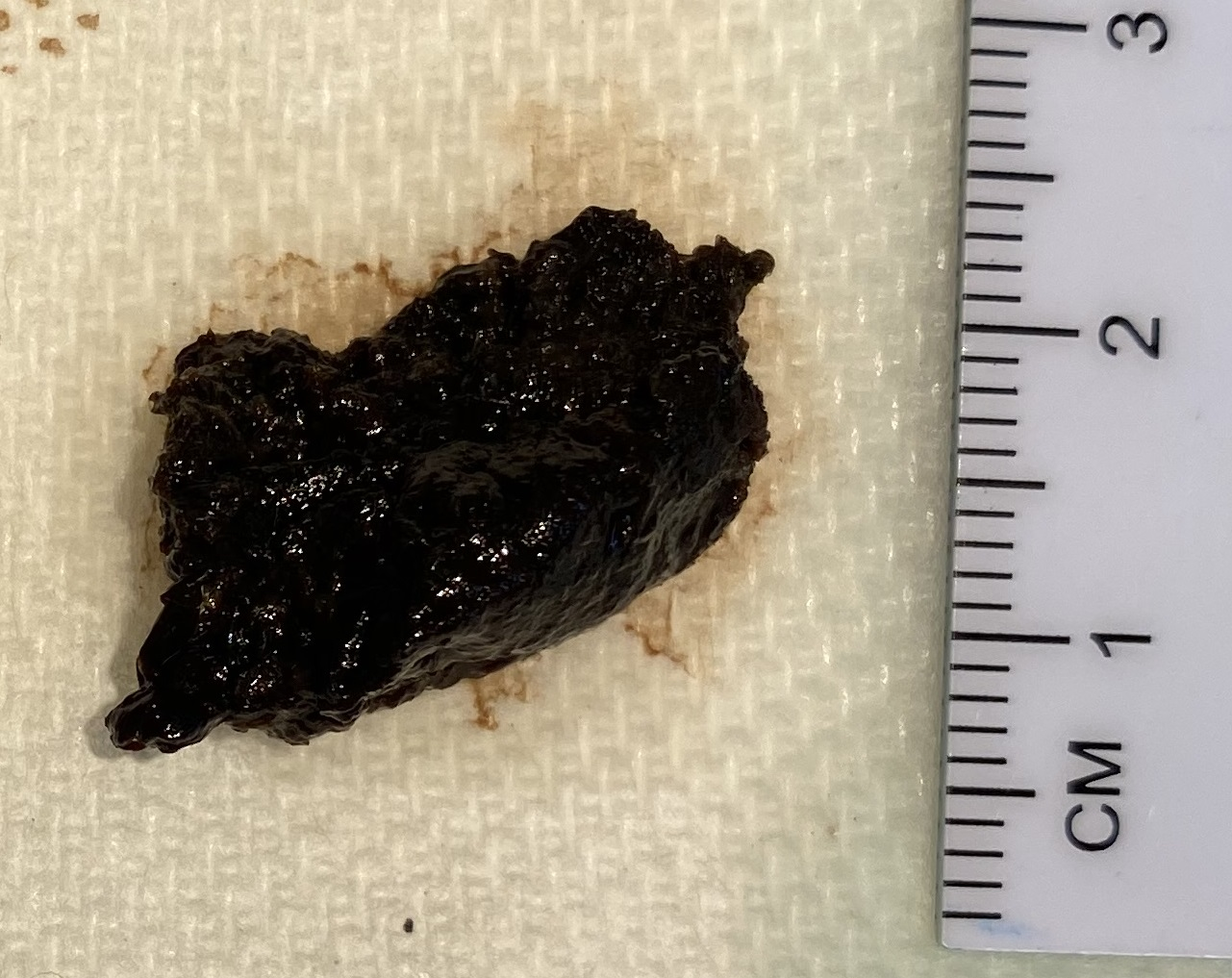
Resected fragments of a brain tumor, and in this case the very dark appearance supports a diagnosis of metastatic pigment-forming melanoma.

Brain imaging (neuroimaging such as CT or MRI) is needed to determine the presence of brain metastases. In particular, contrast-enhanced MRI is the best method of diagnosing brain metastases, although primary detection may be done using CT. Positron emission tomography (PET) is usually not considered suitable for imaging of brain metastases, because the most frequently used PET-radiotracer, ^{18}F-FDG, does not only accumulate in the tumor but is naturally taken up by normal brain tissue, usually resulting in insufficient tumor-to-background contrast. PET-imaging of brain metastases is however feasible using alternative radiotracers, such as the Gallium-68 labeled peptide ^{68}Ga-Trivehexin, a tracer targeting the tumor cell surface protein αvβ6-integrin. ^{68}Ga-Trivehexin demonstrated high uptake in a brain metastasis of tonsil carcinoma but no uptake in the surrounding healthy brain tissue, enabling a delineation of the brain metastasis (see image).

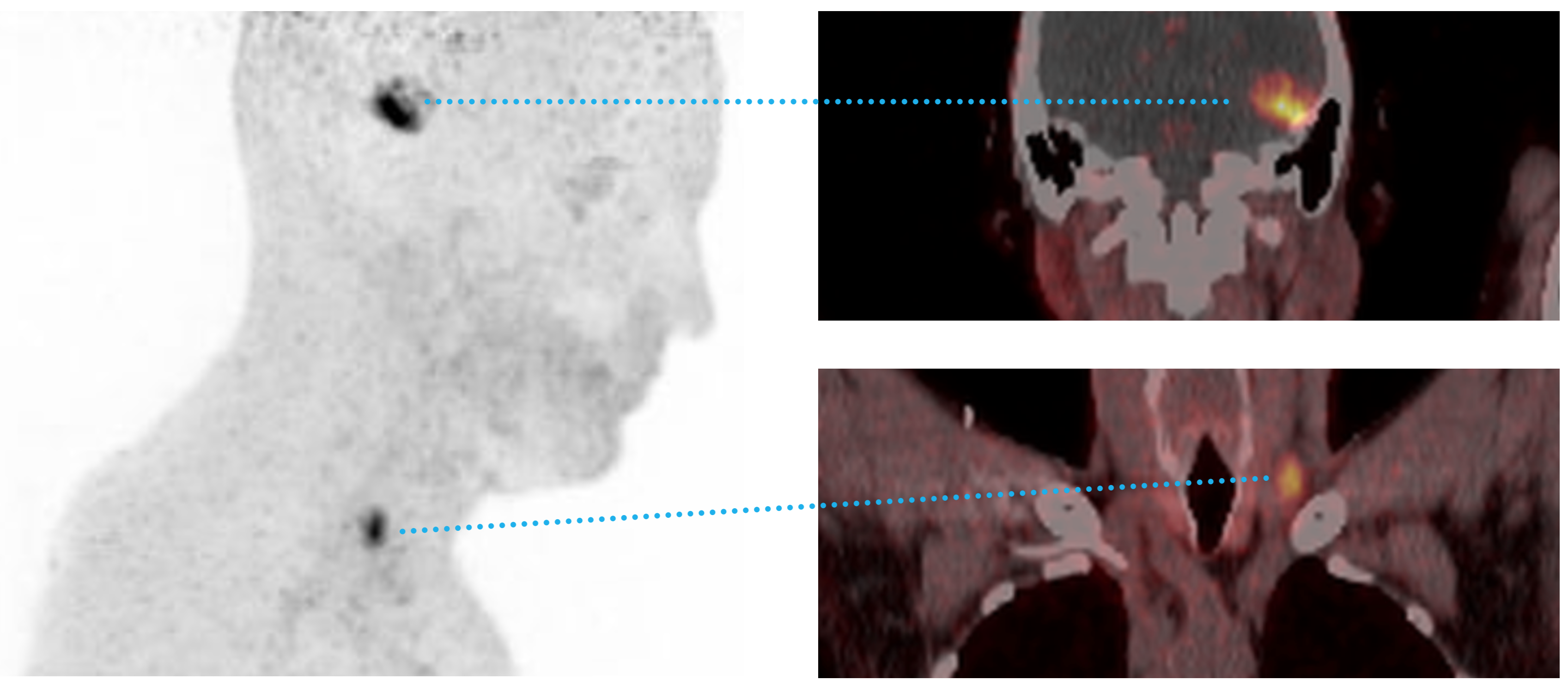
PET/CT imaging of head-and-neck cancer and a brain metastasis thereof, applying the radiotracer ^{68}Ga-Trivehexin.

In addition to imaging, biopsy is often recommended to confirm diagnosis. The diagnosis of brain metastases typically follows a diagnosis of a primary cancer. Occasionally, brain metastases will be diagnosed concurrently with a primary tumor or before the primary tumor is found.

In the setting of brain metastasis due to melanoma, MRI imaging showed high T1 and low T2 intensity due to the deposition of melanin in the brain. In susceptibility weighted imaging (SWI), it usually shows abnormal SWI hypointensity in larger proportion than brain metastasis caused by breast carcinoma.

== Treatment ==
Treatment for brain metastases is primarily palliative, with the goals of therapy being reduction of symptoms and prolongation of life. However, brain metastases harboring a mutation in the BRAF kinase at position V600 are effectively druggable with small molecule inhibitors such as dabrafenib. Unfortunately, drug resistance is observed within 4–6 months after treatment. Recently, expression of NGFR was associated with progressive intracranial disease in melanoma patients Additionally, there is limited evidence that the treatments that are offered takes account of patient-focused comparative effectiveness. However, in some patients, particularly younger, healthier patients, aggressive therapy consisting of open craniotomy with maximal excision, chemotherapy, and radiosurgical intervention (Gamma Knife therapy) may be attempted. Some studies suggest that there may be no consistent benefit to combining radiation and systemic therapy (such as chemotherapy). There is very little evidence on the outcomes of radiation therapy for brain metastases on aspects like quality of life, cognitive functioning, and functional status.

=== Symptomatic care ===
Symptomatic care should be given to all patients with brain metastases, as they often cause severe, debilitating symptoms. Treatment consists mainly of:

- Corticosteroids – Corticosteroid therapy is essential for all patients with brain metastases, as it prevents development of cerebral edema, as well as treating other neurological symptoms such as headaches, cognitive dysfunction, and emesis. Dexamethasone is the corticosteroid of choice. Although neurological symptoms may improve within 24 to 72 hours of starting corticosteroids, cerebral edema may not improve for up to a week. In addition, patients may experience adverse side effects from these drugs, such as myopathy and opportunistic infections, which can be alleviated by decreasing the dose.
- Anticonvulsants – Anticonvulsants should be used for patients with brain metastases who experience seizures, as there is a risk of status epilepticus and death. Newer generation anticonvulsants including lamotrigine and topiramate are recommended due to their relatively limited side effects. It is not recommended to prophylactically give anti-seizure medications when a seizure has not yet been experienced by a patient with brain metastasis.

=== Radiotherapy ===
Radiotherapy plays a critical role in the treatment of brain metastases, and includes whole-brain irradiation, fractionated radiotherapy, and radiosurgery. Whole-brain irradiation is used as a primary treatment method in patients with multiple lesions and is also used alongside surgical resection when patients have single and accessible tumors. However, it often causes severe side effects, including radiation necrosis, dementia, toxic leukoencephalopathy, partial to complete hair loss, nausea, headaches, and otitis media. In children this treatment may cause intellectual impairment, psychiatric disturbances, and other neuropsychiatric effects. Results from a 2021 systematic review on radiation therapy for brain metastases found that despite much research on radiation therapy, there is little evidence to inform comparative effectiveness and such patient-centered outcomes as quality of life, functional status, or cognitive effects. Hippocampal-sparing whole-brain radiotherapy has been investigated as a strategy to reduce neuroconigtive toxicity. The 2021 systematic review found that hippocampal-sparing whole-brain radiotherapy likely increased the time to cognitive decline, although it did not demonstrate improvements in overall survival, disease-free survival, or quality of life.

In addition, whole-brain irradiation in combination with surgery showed no effect on overall survival when compared to whole-brain irradiation alone as demonstrated by a systematic review by the Agency for Healthcare Research and Quality. The 2021 systematic review by the Agency for Healthcare Research also found that there were no major differences in resultant adverse effects between whole-brain irradiation with stereotactic radiosurgery when compared to either approach in isolation. The recent advancements in personalized medicine and targeted therapies, such as the use of BRAF inhibitors in melanoma patients, have shown promises in improving outcomes for certain subsets of patients with brain metastases. Additionally, ongoing research into the genetic and molecular profiles of brain metastases is creating a way for more tailored and effective treatments. The Agency for Healthcare Research and Quality systematic review reports that the combined use of systemic therapy (such as chemotherapy and immunotherapy) and whole brain radiation therapy in comparison with either method alone has not shown to be statistically significant in survival outcomes. The addition of systemic therapy to whole-brain radiotherapy was associated with an increased risk of vomiting compared with whole-brain radiotherapy alone (relative risk 1.44, 95% confidence interval 1.03-2.00), with moderate strength of evidence. In relation to radiation therapy, a study from this organization also showed that combination of stereotactic radio-surgery and whole brain radiation versus the use of either technique alone did not show a statistically significant difference in survival in patients with brain metastasis. Another review concluded that there is not enough evidence to suggest the impact of key clinical outcomes, such as cognitive function and functional status. Even more, the evidence regarding quality of life was considered insufficient.

=== Surgery ===
Brain metastases are often managed surgically if they are accessible. Surgical resection plus whole brain radiotherapy has not shown survival benefit when compared to whole brain radiotherapy alone. In patients with only one metastatic brain lesion and controlled or limited systemic disease, a life expectancy of at least 3 months with maintenance of performance status might be expected.

=== Chemotherapy ===
Chemotherapy is rarely used for the treatment of brain metastases, as chemotherapeutic agents penetrate the blood brain barrier poorly. However, some cancers such as lymphomas, small cell lung carcinomas (SCLC) and breast cancer may be highly chemosensitive and chemotherapy may be used to treat extracranial sites of metastatic disease in these cancers. The effectiveness and safety of using chemotherapy to treat a brain metastasis that came from a SCLC is not clear. An experimental treatment for brain metastases is intrathecal chemotherapy, a technique in which a chemotherapeutic drug is delivered via intralumbar injection into the cerebrospinal fluid. Current research on the treatment of brain metastases includes creating new drug molecules to effectively target the blood-brain barrier and studying the relationship between tumors and various genes. In 2015, the United States FDA approved Alecensa (alectinib) for use in patients with a specific type of non-small cell lung cancer (NSCLC; ALK-positive), a type of cancer which often metastasizes to the brain, whose condition worsened after use or were unable to take another medication, Xalkori (crizotinib).

=== Immunotherapy ===
Immunotherapy, for instance Anti-PD-1 alone or in combination with anti-CTLA-4, appears to be effective in some patients with brain metastases especially when these are asymptomatic, stable and not previously treated. In 2022, OMICs-based approaches such as single-cell and bulk RNA-sequencing revealed molecular subgroups in melanoma brain metastases (MBM) that may explain the variable response of MBM to therapeutic interventions. Moreover, methylome and transcriptome profiling of MBM revealed immune cell and microglia-enriched tumor subsets showing favorable outcome.

== Prognosis ==
The prognosis for brain metastases is variable; it depends on the type of primary cancer, the age of the patient, the absence or presence of extracranial metastases, and the number of metastatic sites in the brain. For patients who do not undergo treatment the average survival is between one and two months. However, in some patients, such as those with no extracranial metastases, those who are younger than 65, and those with a single site of metastasis in the brain only, prognosis is much better, with median survival rates of up to 13.5 months. Because brain metastasis can originate from various different primary cancers, the Karnofsky performance score is used for a more specific prognosis. The PCORI review about radiation therapy brain metastasis states that there isn't enough clinical evidence to know for sure what the outcomes would be like cognitively and functionally. But the evidence shown made them conclude that the quality of like is insufficient to low.

== Epidemiology ==
It is estimated that the worldwide incidence rate for brain metastases lies around 9% to 17%, based on the region of diagnosis. However, the baseline incidence rate of brain metastases were found to increase with improvements to brain imaging technology. Approximately 5-11% of brain metastasis were found to be deadly at 30 days, and 14 - 23% were found to be deadly at three months.

More cases of brain metastases were found in adults, compared to children. 67% to 80% of all cancer patients were found to develop brain metastases, as of 2012. Lung cancer, breast cancer and melanoma patients were found to be at the highest risk of developing brain metastases. However, recent trends in brain metastasis epidemiology have shown an increase in incidence for patients with renal, colorectal, or ovarian cancers. Brain metastases are most commonly diagnosed within multiple intracranial areas within the context of extracranial diseases.

Both population studies and autopsy studies have historically been used to calculate the incidence of brain metastases. However, many researchers have stated that population studies may express inaccurate data for brain metastases, given that surgeons have, in the past, been hesitant to take in patients with the condition. As a result, population studies regarding brain metastases have historically been inaccurate and incomplete.

Advances in systemic treatments of brain metastases, such as radiosurgery, whole-brain radiotherapy and surgical resection has led to an increase in median survival rate of brain metastases patients.

== See also ==
- Neoplasm
- Metastasis
- Cancer
- Brain tumor
