= Ga-68-Trivehexin =

Contrast agent for cancer imaging

Gallium-68 Trivehexin INN: Gallium-68 relitegatide brexetan

Identifiers
- IUPAC name: [4,7-bis[[[3-[3-[4-[3-[4-[(3S,6S,9S,12S,18S,21S,24S,27R)-18-(3-carbamimidamidopropyl)-12-(carboxymethyl)-3,21-bis[(4-hydroxyphenyl)methyl]-6,25-dimethyl-9-(2-methylpropyl)-2,5,8,11,14,17,20,23,26-nonaoxo-1,4,7,10,13,16,19,22,25-nonazabicyclo[25.3.0]triacontan-24-yl]butylamino]-3-oxopropyl]triazol-1-yl]propylamino]-3-oxopropyl]-oxidophosphoryl]methyl]-1,4,7-triazonan-1-yl]methyl-[3-[3-[4-[3-[4-[(3S,6S,9S,12S,18S,21S,24S,27R)-18-(3-carbamimidamidopropyl)-12-(carboxymethyl)-3,21-bis[(4-hydroxyphenyl)methyl]-6,25-dimethyl-9-(2-methylpropyl)-2,5,8,11,14,17,20,23,26-nonaoxo-1,4,7,10,13,16,19,22,25-nonazabicyclo[25.3.0]triacontan-24-yl]butylamino]-3-oxopropyl]triazol-1-yl]propylamino]-3-oxopropyl]phosphinate;gallium-68(3+)
- CAS Number: 3061847-76-2
- PubChem CID: 168429490
- UNII: 56VJ6PVP37

Chemical and physical data
- Formula: C_{195}H_{288}GaN_{54}O_{51}P_{3}
- Molar mass: 4367.420 g·mol^{−1}
- 3D model (JSmol): Interactive image
- SMILES: C[C@H]1C(=O)N[C@H](C(=O)N2CCC[C@@H]2C(=O)N([C@H](C(=O)N[C@H](C(=O)N[C@H](C(=O)NCC(=O)N[C@H](C(=O)N[C@H](C(=O)N1)CC(C)C)CC(=O)O)CCCNC(=N)N)CC3=CC=C(C=C3)O)CCCCNC(=O)CCC4=CN(N=N4)CCCNC(=O)CCP(=O)(CN5CCN(CCN(CC5)CP(=O)(CCC(=O)NCCCN6C=C(N=N6)CCC(=O)NCCCC[C@H]7C(=O)N[C@H](C(=O)N[C@H](C(=O)NCC(=O)N[C@H](C(=O)N[C@H](C(=O)N[C@H](C(=O)N[C@H](C(=O)N8CCC[C@@H]8C(=O)N7C)CC9=CC=C(C=C9)O)C)CC(C)C)CC(=O)O)CCCNC(=N)N)CC1=CC=C(C=C1)O)[O-])CP(=O)(CCC(=O)NCCCN1C=C(N=N1)CCC(=O)NCCCC[C@H]1C(=O)N[C@H](C(=O)N[C@H](C(=O)NCC(=O)N[C@H](C(=O)N[C@H](C(=O)N[C@H](C(=O)N[C@H](C(=O)N2CCC[C@@H]2C(=O)N1C)CC1=CC=C(C=C1)O)C)CC(C)C)CC(=O)O)CCCNC(=N)N)CC1=CC=C(C=C1)O)[O-])[O-])C)CC1=CC=C(C=C1)O.[68Ga+3]
- InChI: InChI=InChI=1S/C195H291N54O51P3.Ga/c1-115(2)94-139-175(277)214-118(7)169(271)229-148(100-124-43-58-133(253)59-44-124)187(289)247-82-22-34-154(247)190(292)238(10)151(184(286)226-142(97-121-37-52-130(250)53-38-121)178(280)220-136(28-19-73-208-193(196)197)172(274)211-106-163(262)217-145(103-166(265)266)181(283)223-139)31-13-16-70-202-157(256)64-49-127-109-244(235-232-127)79-25-76-205-160(259)67-91-301(295,296)112-241-85-87-242(113-302(297,298)92-68-161(260)206-77-26-80-245-110-128(233-236-245)50-65-158(257)203-71-17-14-32-152-185(287)227-143(98-122-39-54-131(251)55-40-122)179(281)221-137(29-20-74-209-194(198)199)173(275)212-107-164(263)218-146(104-167(267)268)182(284)224-140(95-116(3)4)176(278)215-119(8)170(272)230-149(101-125-45-60-134(254)61-46-125)188(290)248-83-23-35-155(248)191(293)239(152)11)89-90-243(88-86-241)114-303(299,300)93-69-162(261)207-78-27-81-246-111-129(234-237-246)51-66-159(258)204-72-18-15-33-153-186(288)228-144(99-123-41-56-132(252)57-42-123)180(282)222-138(30-21-75-210-195(200)201)174(276)213-108-165(264)219-147(105-168(269)270)183(285)225-141(96-117(5)6)177(279)216-120(9)171(273)231-150(102-126-47-62-135(255)63-48-126)189(291)249-84-24-36-156(249)192(294)240(153)12;/h37-48,52-63,109-111,115-120,136-156,250-255H,13-36,49-51,64-108,112-114H2,1-12H3,(H,202,256)(H,203,257)(H,204,258)(H,205,259)(H,206,260)(H,207,261)(H,211,274)(H,212,275)(H,213,276)(H,214,277)(H,215,278)(H,216,279)(H,217,262)(H,218,263)(H,219,264)(H,220,280)(H,221,281)(H,222,282)(H,223,283)(H,224,284)(H,225,285)(H,226,286)(H,227,287)(H,228,288)(H,229,271)(H,230,272)(H,231,273)(H,265,266)(H,267,268)(H,269,270)(H,295,296)(H,297,298)(H,299,300)(H4,196,197,208)(H4,198,199,209)(H4,200,201,210);/q;+3/p-3/t118-,119-,120-,136-,137-,138-,139-,140-,141-,142-,143-,144-,145-,146-,147-,148-,149-,150-,151-,152-,153-,154+,155+,156+;/m0./s1/i;1-2; Key:XQKHPHFSWXYCLX-SNFBFVMKSA-K

^{68}Ga-Trivehexin is a radiotracer for positron emission tomography (PET), obtained by labeling the peptide conjugate Trivehexin (INN: relitegatide brexetan) with the positron emitting radionuclide gallium-68 (^{68}Ga). ^{68}Ga-Trivehexin targets (i.e., binds to) the cell surface receptor αvβ6-integrin and accumulates in αvβ6-integrin-abundant tissues after intravenous (i.v.) application. ^{68}Ga-Trivehexin is thus applied for PET imaging of medical conditions associated with elevated αvβ6-integrin expression.

αvβ6-Integrin, the biological target of ^{68}Ga-Trivehexin, is a heterodimeric transmembrane cell adhesion receptor whose primary natural ligand is latency associated peptide (LAP) in its complex with transforming growth factor beta 1 (TGF-β1). Binding of αvβ6-integrin to LAP releases and thus, activates TGF-β1. In early-stage cancer, TGF-β1 acts as a tumor suppressor but can turn into a tumor promoter as cancers develop, and furthermore induces fibrosis, particularly of the lung. As the likely most important activator of TGF-β1, αvβ6-integrin is often found overexpressed in tumors and fibrosis, which is why ^{68}Ga-Trivehexin PET imaging is primarily relevant in this medical context.

== Chemistry ==
=== Trivehexin precursor ===
Like most precursors used for radiolabeling with radioactive metal cations, Trivehexin is composed of a dedicated complex ligand (a so-called chelator) for kinetically inert binding of the ^{68}Ga^{III} ion, and the bioligand(s) for binding to αvβ6-integrin. The chelator comprised in Trivehexin is a triazacycloalkane with 3 phosphinic acid substituents, with the basic structure 1,4,7-triazacyclononane-1,4,7-triphosphinate (frequently abbreviated TRAP). The αvβ6-integrin binding molecular unit is a cyclic nonapeptide with the amino acid sequence cyclo(YRGDLAYp(NMe)K) (INN: relitegatide).

In the Trivehexin molecule, three of these cyclopeptides are attached by covalent bonds to a single TRAP chelator core. Since TRAP possesses three equivalent carboxylic acids for conjugation of other molecular units via amide formation, Trivehexin is a C3-symmetrical molecule with its three peptide bioligands being fully equivalent. The peptides are attached to the chelator core via the terminal amine group of the side chains of N-methyl lysine. Actually, the conjugation is not done by amide bonding directly, but involves prior functionalization of the peptide with a short molecular extension (a linker) bearing a terminal alkyne, and of TRAP with three linkers bearing terminal azides. These components are assembled by means of copper(I) catalyzed alkyne-azide cycloaddition (CuAAC, also known as Huisgen reaction, a Click chemistry reaction), giving rise to the three 1,3-triazole linkages in the ^{68}Ga-Trivehexin structure.

Trivehexin is manufactured and distributed by the German company TRIMT GmbH.

=== ^{68}Ga radiolabeling ===
^{68}Ga-Trivehexin is a radioactive drug. The radioactive atom, gallium-68 (^{68}Ga), decays with a half-life of approximately 68 min to the stable isotope zinc-68 (^{68}Zn), to 89% by β^{+} decay whereby a positron with a maximum kinetic energy of 1.9 MeV is emitted (the remaining 11% are EC decays). Due to the short half-life, ^{68}Ga-Trivehexin can not be manufactured long before use but the ^{68}Ga has to be introduced into the molecule shortly before application. This process is referred to as radiolabeling, and is done by complexation of the trivalent cation ^{68}Ga^{III} by the TRAP chelator in Trivehexin.

^{68}Ga^{III} is usually obtained from a dedicated mobile radionuclide source, a Gallium-68 generator, in form of a solution in dilute (0.04–0.1 M) hydrochloric acid (frequently and imprecisely referred to as "^{68}Ga chloride solution in HCl" despite it contains no species with a Ga–Cl bond but [^{68}Ga(H_{2}O)_{6}]^{3+} complex hydrate cations). For radiolabeling, the pH of the ^{68}Ga containing generator eluate has to be raised from its initial value (depending on HCl concentration, pH 1–1.5) to pH 2–3.5 using suitable buffers, such as sodium acetate. Then, Trivehexin (5–10 nmol) is added to the buffered ^{68}Ga-containing solution, and the mixture is briefly heated to 50–100 °C (usually 2–3 min) to finalize the complexation reaction.

== Use as medical imaging agent ==
=== αvβ6-integrin target ===
The abundance of αvβ6-integrin on most adult human cell types and respective tissues is low. It is however overexpressed in the context of several medical conditions, such as cancer or fibrosis, particularly idiopathic pulmonary fibrosis.

In line with the finding that αvβ6-integrin is expressed by epithelial cells, an elevated density of the protein is observed on the cell surfaces of many carcinomas (synonymous to cancers of epithelial origin). Hence, ^{68}Ga-Trivehexin can be used for PET imaging of αvβ6-integrin positive cancers (i.e., those whose cells possess a sufficiently high density of αvβ6 on their surface), including but not limited to pancreatic ductal adenocarcinoma, non-small cell lung cancer, squamous cell carcinomas (SCC) of different origin (most notably, oral and esophageal SCC), as well as breast, ovarian, and bladder cancer. In colorectal cancer, expression of αvβ6-integrin is higher in the more aggressive forms and correlated with reduced overall survival.

^{68}Ga-Trivehexin has a high binding affinity to αvβ6-integrin (IC_{50} = 0.047 nM). Its affinity to other RGD-binding integrins is much lower (IC_{50} for αvβ3, αvβ8, and α5β1 are 2.7, 6.2, and 22 nM, respectively; note that for IC_{50}, higher values mean lower affinity), resulting in a high selectivity for αvβ6-integrin.

=== Imaging procedure ===
Since ^{68}Ga is a positron emitter, ^{68}Ga-Trivehexin is applicable for PET imaging. However, PET is rarely used as a standalone imaging technique these days. Most clinics use PET/CT or even PET/MRI systems that acquire morphological and functional images in a single workflow and thus, provide more detailed and useful medical information to the physician.

For clinical PET/CT diagnostics, an activity in the range of 80–150 MBq ^{68}Ga-Trivehexin is injected intravenously (i.v.). The tracer then distributes with the blood flow and moves into tissues by diffusion, where it specifically binds to its target αvβ6-integrin, while an excess is excreted via the kidneys and the urine. As a result, ^{68}Ga-Trivehexin and, therefore, the positron-emitting radionuclide ^{68}Ga, is preferably accumulated by αvβ6-integrin abundant tissues (for example, tumor tissue). Next, a PET/CT scanner is used to detect the gamma radiation which is generated by the annihilation of the positrons emitted by ^{68}Ga (not the actual positrons, which do not leave the body but travel only a few millimetres through the tissue). The spatial distribution of the annihilation events is reconstructed from the raw detector data (referred to as listmode data), which eventually delivers a 3-dimensional data set of radioactivity distribution in the body. These data allow the visualization of αvβ6-integrin positive tissues as 2-dimensional tomographic images or 3-dimensional volume rendering. Typically, the PET/CT imaging is performed 45–60 minutes after the i.v. administration of ^{68}Ga-Trivehexin.

=== Cancers imaging ===
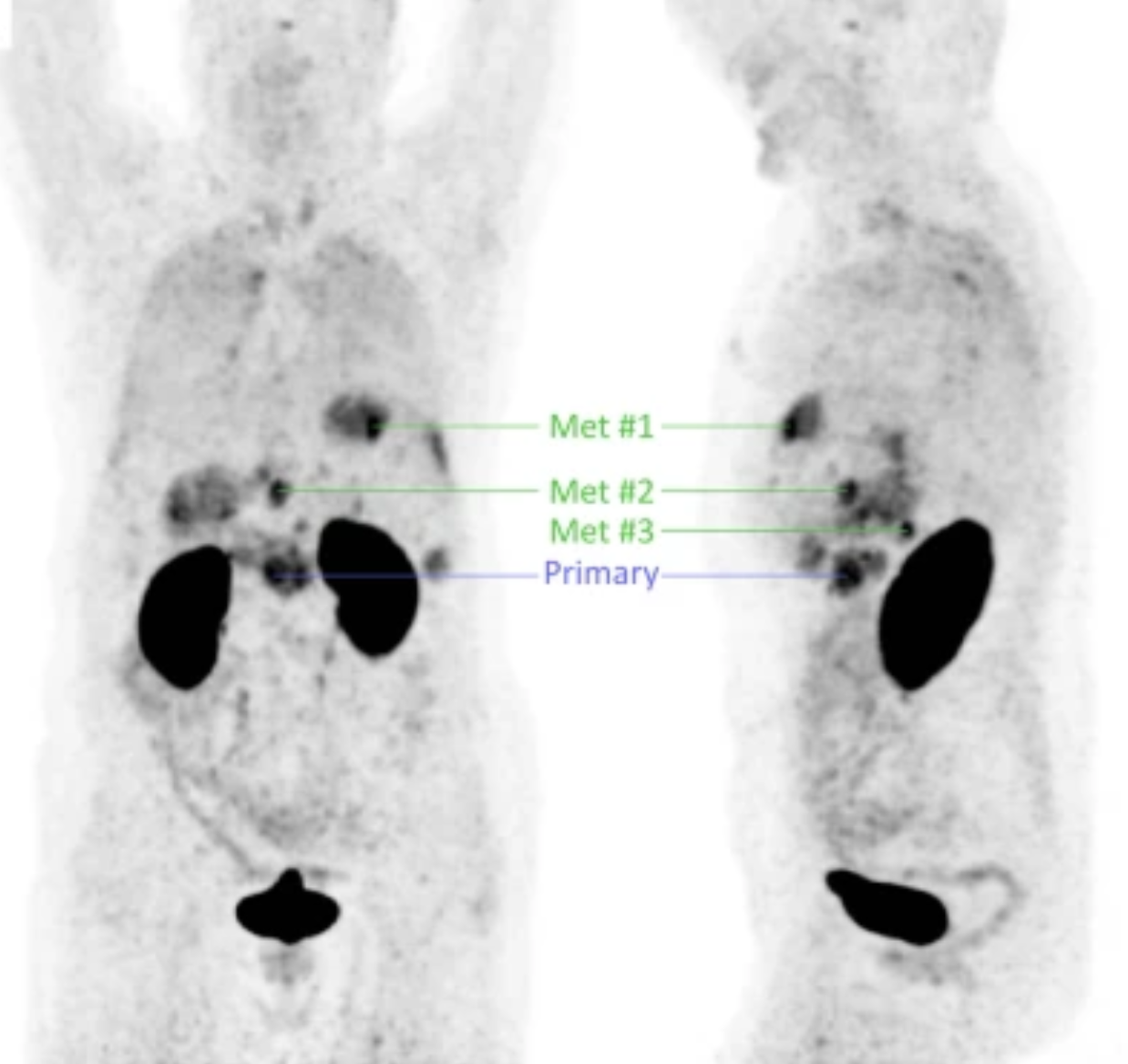
^{68}Ga-Trivehexin PET image of a female patient with pancreatic ductal adenocarcinoma (PDAC), shown as maximum intensity projections in frontal (left) and lateral (right) position. The primary tumor in the pancreatic head (labeled 'Primary') and a total of 7 liver metastases (the 3 largest are labeled Met#1, Met#2 and Met#3) are clearly delineated. Due to renal excretion, a prominent signal is observed in the kidneys (center of images) and in the contents of the urinary bladder (lower image regions).

^{68}Ga-Trivehexin has not yet obtained a marketing approval. It is used for clinical imaging of αvβ6-integrin expression in experimental settings.

==== Pancreatic cancer ====
First-in-human application of different αvβ6-integrin radiotracers has demonstrated that ^{68}Ga-Trivehexin performed especially well in detecting pancreatic cancer, showing high uptake in tumor lesions and low background in the gastrointestinal tract (GI tract) (see image). Since its introduction, ^{68}Ga-Trivehexin has been used predominantly for PET/CT imaging of pancreatic ductal adenocarcinoma (PDAC), for example, in single cases and two cohorts (12 and 44 patients, respectively) of suspected or known PDAC.

==== Breast cancer ====
The feasibility of ^{68}Ga-Trivehexin PET imaging of breast cancer (BC) was demonstrated in a case of triple-negative BC. Another report suggested that ^{68}Ga-Trivehexin PET/CT might offer superior detection efficacy for breast cancer compared to ^{18}F-FDG PET/CT. Furthermore, in progesterone- and estrogen-receptor negative BC with elevated Ki67 proliferation index and strong E-cadherin, ^{68}Ga-Trivehexin PET identified several ^{18}F-FDG-avid lymph nodes as false positives. In a patient with lobular BC and pancreatic neuroendocrine tumor (PNET), ^{68}Ga-Trivehexin selectively showed a PET signal only in the lobular carcinoma, while the metabolic tracer ^{18}F-FGD and the neuroendocrine tumor tracer ^{68}Ga-DOTATATE yielded PET signals for both the BC and PNET lesions.

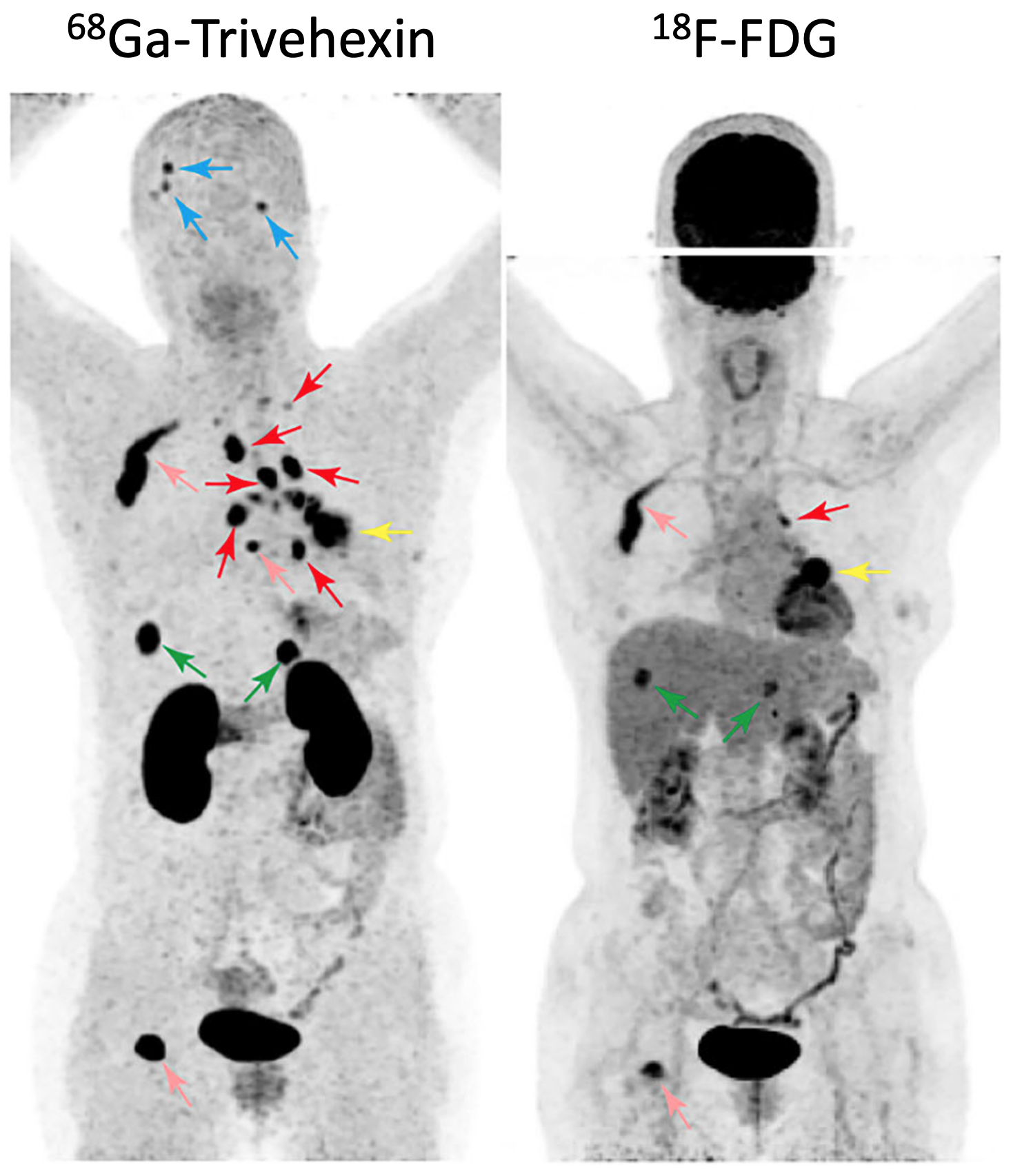
Representative ^{68}Ga-Trivehexin PET/CT (left) of a 55-year-old woman with lung adenocarcinoma and multiple metastatic lesions, compared with ^{18}F-FDG PET/CT (right). Both images show maximum intensity projections (MIPs). Yellow arrows: Primary tumor (SUV_{max}: 20.7 for ^{68}Ga-Trivehexin, vs. 12.5 for ^{18}F-FDG). Red arrows: Metastatic lesions including lymph node metastases (SUV_{max}: 23.9 vs 7.4). Blue arrows: Brain metastases (SUV_{max}: 3.4– 6.9 vs. 9.8–12.9). Green arrows: Liver metastases (SUV_{max}: 22.7 vs. 7.1). Pink arrows: Bone metastases (SUV_{max}: 20.4 vs. 11.2).

==== Lung cancer ====
A prospective clinical study (NCT05835570) involving 58 participants with non-small cell lung cancer (NSCLC) compared the diagnostic performance of ^{68}Ga-Trivehexin PET/CT with ^{18}F-FDG PET/CT. Both radiotracers showed similar diagnostic accuracy (100%, 58/58) for the detection of primary tumors. The sensitivity for detection of lymph node metastases was comparable for ^{68}Ga-Trivehexin (80%) and ^{18}F-FDG (72%), but ^{68}Ga-Trivehexin showed a higher specificity (93.8%) and accuracy (91.2%) than ^{18}F-FDG (62.5% and 64.2%, respectively). Sensitivity for detecting brain metastasis was 92.3% for ^{68}Ga-Trivehexin and 38.5% for ^{18}F-FDG, mainly because of the high glucose consumption of normal brain tissue, which usually results in a high physiological uptake of ^{18}F-FDG in the brain, generating a strong background signal which frequently obscures brain metastases in PET images (see image).

Application of ^{68}Ga-Trivehexin PET was reported for single cases of other, rare forms of lung cancer, such as bronchial mucoepidermoid carcinoma and mucinous lung adenocarcinoma.

==== Head-and-neck cancer ====
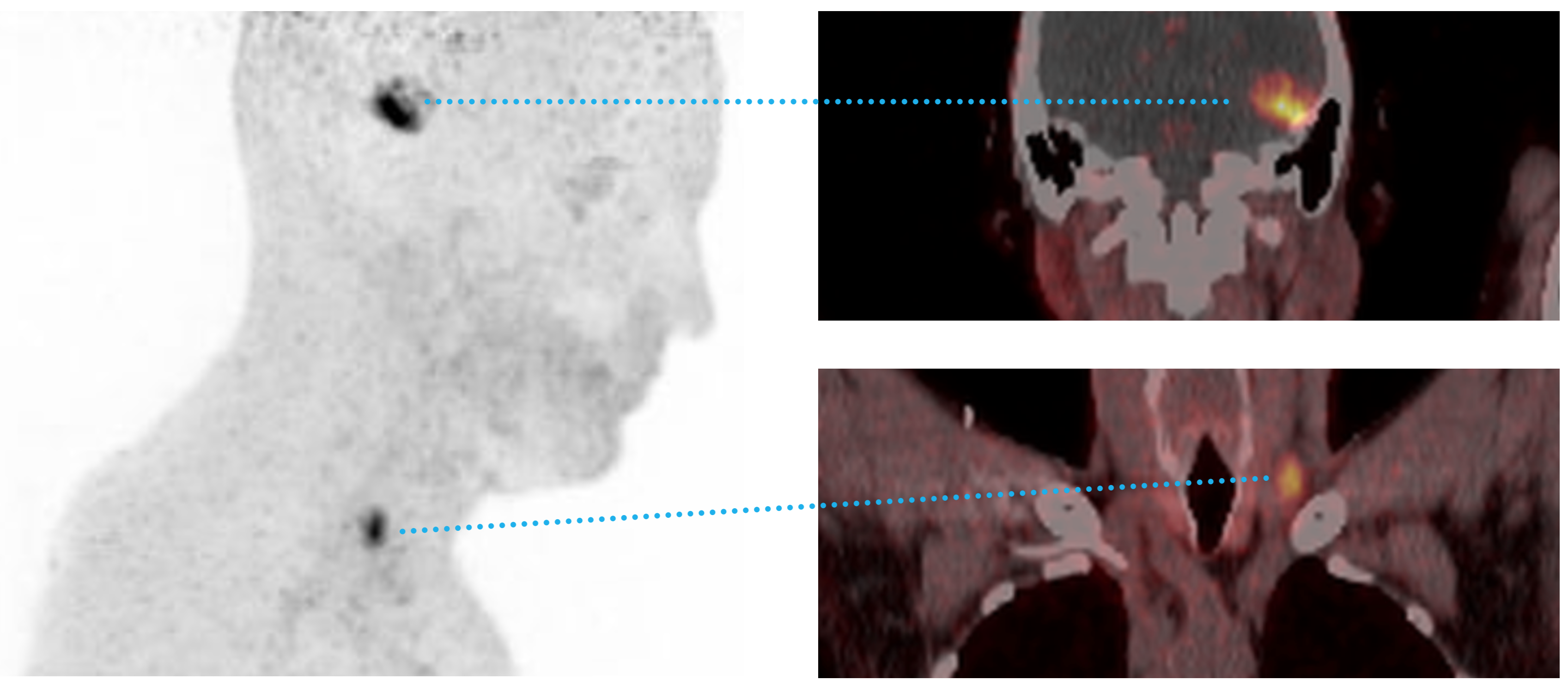
^{68}Ga-Trivehexin PET/CT of head-and-neck cancer with brain metastasis.

In a cohort of 20 suspected (19 confirmed) head-and-neck squamous cell carcinoma (HNSCC) cases, ^{68}Ga-Trivehexin PET had a higher sensitivity (92.5%), positive predictive value (PPV, 100%), and accuracy (93%) than the standard ^{18}F-FDG PET, for which sensitivity, PPV, and accuracy were 90%, 93.1%, and 84.3%, respectively. ^{68}Ga-Trivehexin was furthermore applied in a case of tonsillar carcinoma metastasized to the brain (see image).

==== Other cancers ====
^{68}Ga-Trivehexin was also applied in cases of recurrent parathyroid carcinoma and papillary thyroid carcinoma.

=== Imaging of benign and non-oncological conditions ===
==== Primary hyperparathyroidism and parathyroid adenoma ====
In the context of primary hyperparathyroidism (PHPT), ^{68}Ga-Trivehexin PET/CT was successfully applied for PET imaging of disseminated parathyroid adenoma (PTA). In a 13-patient cohort, a PTA detection rate of 94.1% was found. A retrospective analysis of 38 PHPT patients determined a lesion-based detection rate of 98% (49/50), and yet another study in 44 patients found a sensitivity of 97.3% and a PPV of 100% compared to a composite reference standard of Technetium (99mTc) sestamibi scintigraphy and ultrasound (US). ^{68}Ga-Trivehexin PET/CT was furthermore used for delineation of osteolysis-associated brown tumors which occur as a result of persistent hyperparathyroidism.

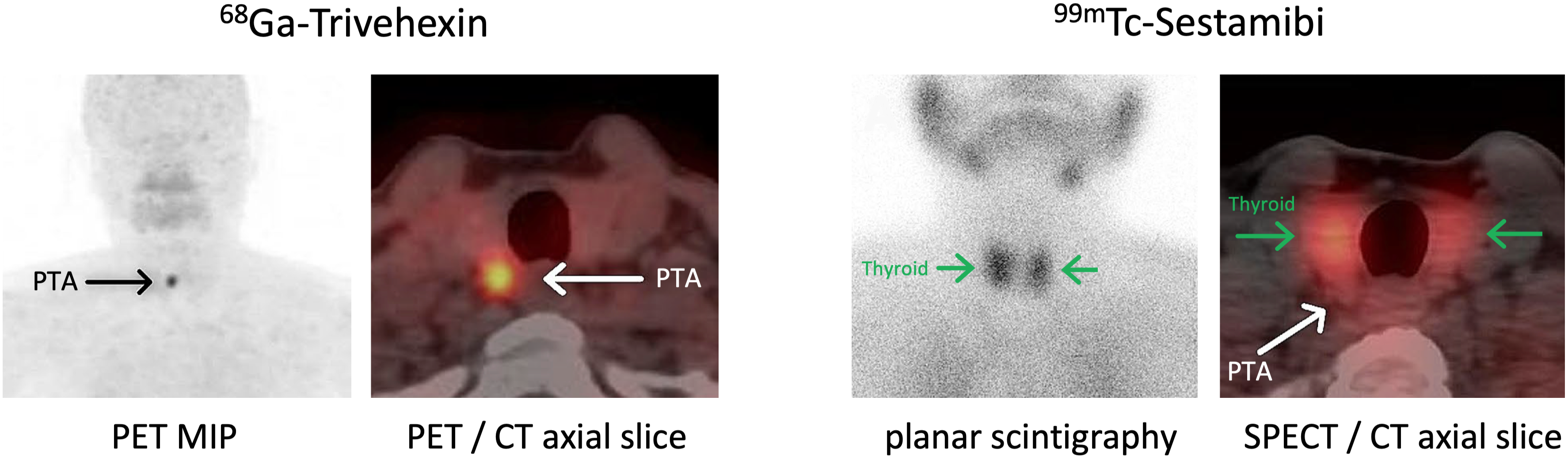
Imaging of a patient with primary hyperparathyroidism (PHPT). A single parathyroid adenoma lesion (marked with arrows labeled 'PTA') is seen in the ^{68}Ga-Trivehexin PET MIP (maximum intensity projection) and a PET/CT axial (transverse) slice though the lesion. The same patient was diagnosed using the imaging agent ^{99m}Tc-Sestamibi, which is standard-of-care for PHPT diagnostics. The PTA is not seen on planar scintigraphy or SPECT/CT images. Instead, a moderate physiological uptake is observed in the healthy thyroid (marked with green arrows).

==== Fibrosis ====
In accordance with the known expression of αvβ6-integrin in early lung fibrosis, ^{68}Ga-Trivehexin was used for PET/CT imaging of idiopathic pulmonary fibrosis (IPF). In explorative studies, ^{68}Ga-Trivehexin could generate an IPF-specific PET signal while the same tissue areas were PET-negative using the standard metabolic PET tracer ^{18}F-FDG. ^{68}Ga-Trivehexin PET scans displayed an uptake of SUV_{max} = 5.53 in fibrotic lung areas and thus enabled clear differentiation of fibrotic from non-fibrotic lung tissue.

=== Safety ===
Like for other radioactive imaging agents in medicine, the applied amounts of radioactivity are so low that radiation-related adverse effects are very unlikely to occur, and have not been observed in practice. Consistent with the "tracer principle", the amount of pharmacologically active compound injected to a patient in the course of such an examination is extremely low. Adverse events, such as toxicity or allergic reactions, are thus highly improbable. No adverse or clinically detectable pharmacologic effects were observed following intravenous administration of ^{68}Ga-Trivehexin when administered to cancer patients, and there were no significant changes in vital signs, laboratory study results, or electrocardiograms. In a study involving healthy volunteers, researchers again reported no adverse or clinically detectable pharmacologic effects and no significant changes in vital signs.
