= Whole brain radiotherapy =

Treatment for cancer in the brain

- Specialty: Oncology

Whole brain radiotherapy (WBRT) is a treatment option for patients with brain metastases. In WBRT, radiation therapy is administered broadly, to the whole brain, over multiple treatments. Another type of WBRT is hippocampal-avoidance whole brain radiotherapy (HA-WBRT). HA-WBRT is an altered version of WBRT, where it is highly selective as to where the radiation dose is delivered by treating the whole brain while reducing the amount on the hippocampus.

== Usage ==
WBRT has been shown to alleviate symptoms, decrease the use of corticosteroids needed to control tumor-associated edema, and potentially improve overall survival. However, WBRT has been reported to increase the risk of cognitive decline. Additionally, single trials suggest that WBRT with memantine or hippocampal sparing may delay cognitive decline, though these methods did not improve survival or quality of life.

WBRT may be administered in combination with stereotactic radiosurgery (SRS), surgery, or systemic therapies. Based on data, WBRT combined with systemic therapies increased the likelihood of vomiting but overall, there were no other major differences regarding adverse events between these two treatment methods. Memantine has been recommended for use by professional organization consensus to prevent neurocognitive decline after WBRT. While these can improve survival for some patients with single brain metastasis, a 2021 systematic review of the literature found inconsistent results for overall survival.
