= Renal anaplastic sarcoma =

- Specialty: Urology, oncology

Renal anaplastic sarcoma is a rare cancer of the kidney. By 2017 about 25 cases have been reported. This tumour occurs in children and young adults and is more common in females than males.

Because of its rarity its natural history is not well understood.

== Genetics ==
An association with mutations in the DICER-1 gene has been reported.

== Diagnosis ==
Aspiration cytology may be of use in making the diagnosis. CT scans of the abdomen and the rest of the body are normally done to assist in surgical planning.

The age at diagnosis of this condition varies between 10 months to 41 years. The male:female ratio is 2:3. The most common presentation is an asymptomatic abdominal mass. The tumour is more common on the right and it may metastise to lung, liver and bone.

=== Histology ===
On histology the tumours have a marked spindle cell component. Other cells may be bizarre in shape. Cartilage or bone tissue may be found. A cystic component may be present.

The differential diagnosis includes

- anaplastic Wilms' tumor
- renal synovial sarcomas
- malignant mesenchymomas
- ectomesenchymomas

== Treatment ==
Because of the rarity of this tumour, optimal treatment is as yet unknown. It is usually treated by excision. Radiation and chemotherapy have also been used in addition to surgery.

== History ==
This tumour was first described in 2007. This lesion was recognised during a review of a series of 15,000 renal tumours.
