= Kidney cancer =

Cancer that starts in the kidneys

- Other names: Renal cancer
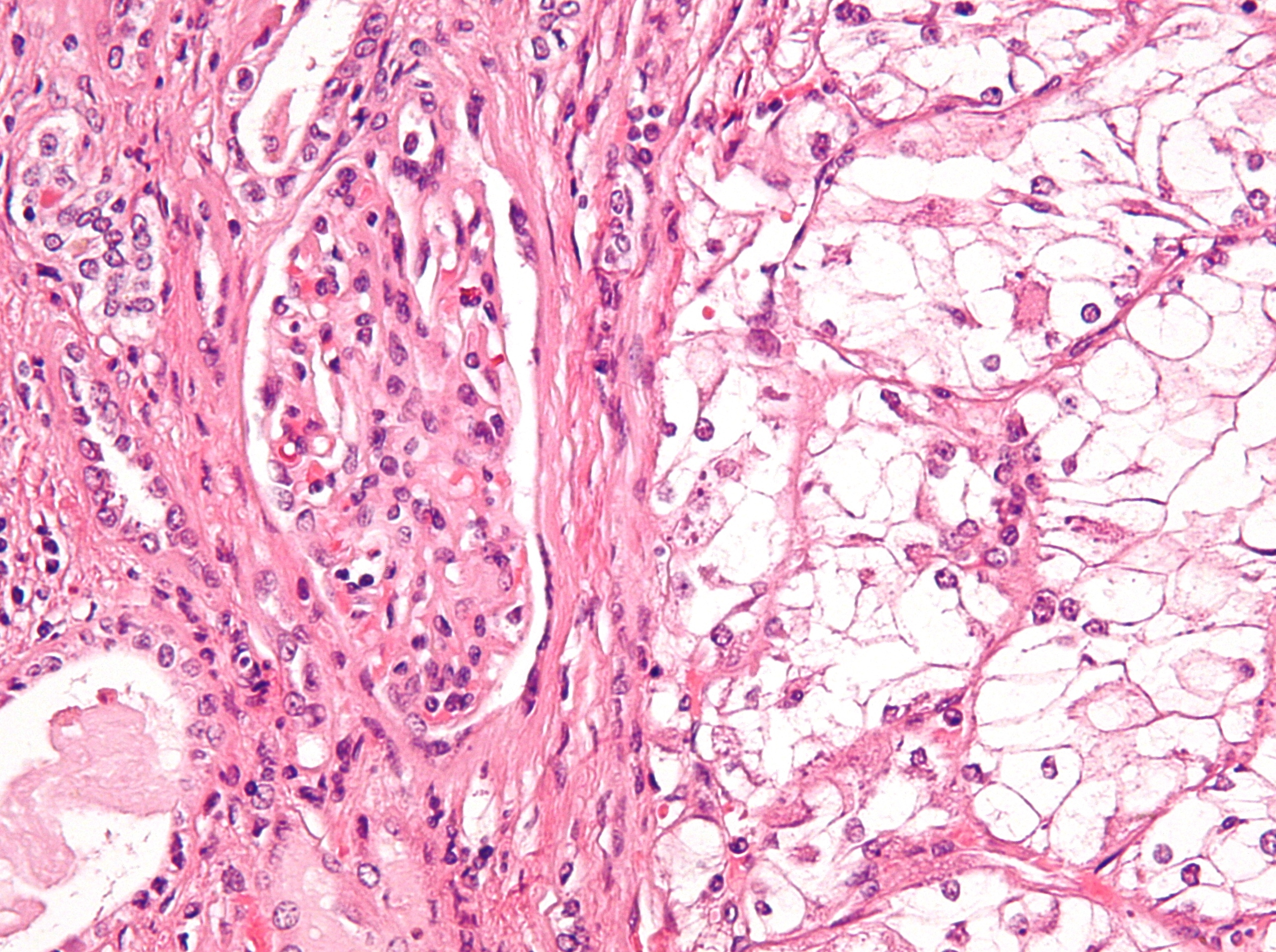
- Micrograph showing the most common type of kidney cancer (clear cell renal cell carcinoma). H&E stain.
- Specialty: Oncology, nephrology, urology
- Symptoms: Blood in the urine, swelling, fatigue, loss of appetite, high blood pressure, foamy urine, lump in the abdomen, back pain
- Usual onset: After the age of 45
- Types: Renal cell carcinoma (RCC), transitional cell carcinoma (TCC), Wilms tumor
- Risk factors: Smoking, certain pain medications, previous bladder cancer, being overweight, high blood pressure, certain chemicals, family history
- Diagnostic method: Tissue biopsy
- Treatment: Surgery, radiation therapy, chemotherapy, immunotherapy, targeted therapy
- Prognosis: Five-year survival ~78% (US 2021)
- Frequency: 403,300 (2018)
- Deaths: 175,000

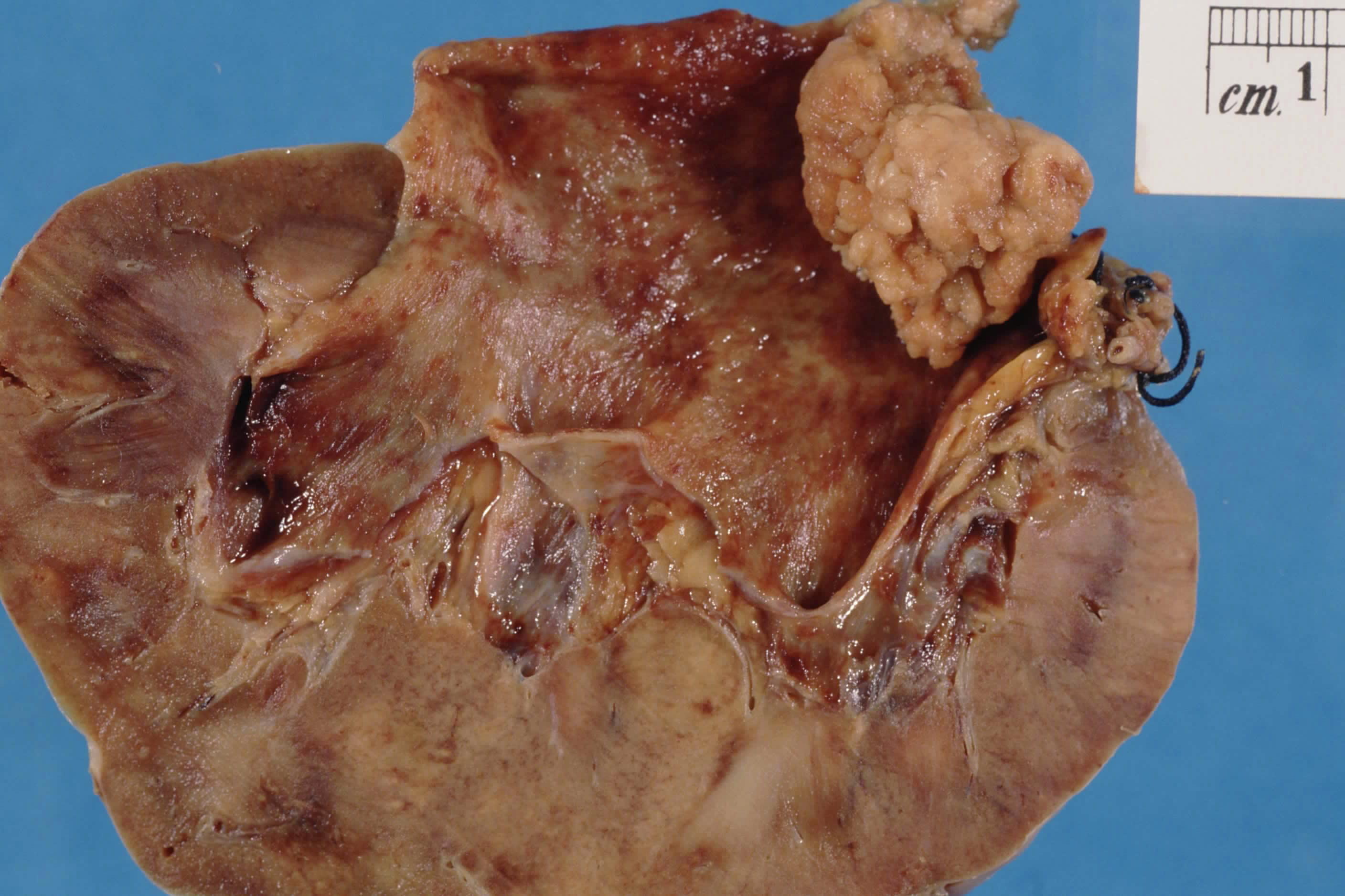
Papillary transitional cell carcinoma, renal pelvis, with urinary obstruction and pyelonephritis

Kidney cancer, also known as renal cancer, is a group of cancers that start in the kidney. Symptoms may include blood in the urine, a lump in the abdomen, or back pain. Fever, weight loss, and tiredness may also occur. Complications can include spread to the lungs or brain.

The main types of kidney cancer are renal cell cancer (RCC), transitional cell cancer (TCC), and Wilms' tumor. RCC makes up about 80% of kidney cancers, and TCC accounts for most of the rest. Risk factors for RCC and TCC include smoking, certain pain medications, previous bladder cancer, being overweight, high blood pressure, certain chemicals, and a family history. Risk factors for Wilms' tumor include a family history and certain genetic disorders such as WAGR syndrome. Diagnosis may be suspected based on symptoms, urine testing, and medical imaging. It is confirmed by tissue biopsy.

Treatment may include surgery, radiation therapy, chemotherapy, immunotherapy, and targeted therapy. Kidney cancer newly affected about 403,300 people and resulted in 175,000 deaths globally in 2018. Onset is usually after the age of 45. The overall five-year survival rate is 78% in the United States and 73% in Canada. Using older statistics from 2017 and 2018, the survival rate was 70% in China, and 60% in Europe. For cancers that are confined to the kidney, the five-year survival rate is 93%; if it has spread to the surrounding lymph nodes, it is 76%, and if it has spread widely, it is 19%. Kidney cancer has been identified as the 13th-most-common form of cancer, and is responsible for 2% of the world's cancer cases and deaths. The incidence of kidney cancer has continued to increase since 1930. Renal cancer is more commonly found in populations of urban areas than rural areas.

== Signs and symptoms ==
Early on, kidney masses do not typically cause any symptoms and are undetectable on physical examination. As kidney cancer becomes more advanced, it classically results in blood in the urine, flank or back pain, and a mass. Other symptoms consistent with advanced disease include weight loss, fever, night sweats, palpable swollen lymph nodes in the neck, nonreducing varicocele, bone pain, continuous cough, and bilateral lower-leg swelling.

Paraneoplastic syndromes caused by kidney cancer can be broadly classified as endocrine or nonendocrine. Endocrine dysfunctions include increase in blood calcium levels (hypercalcemia), high blood pressure (hypertension), increased red blood cells (polycythemia), liver dysfunction, milky nipple discharge unrelated normal breast-feeding (galactorrhea), and Cushing's syndrome. Nonendocrine dysfunctions include deposition of protein in tissue (amyloidosis), decrease in hemoglobin or red blood cells (anemia), disorders of nerves, muscles (neuromyopathies), blood vessels (vasculopathy), and blood clotting mechanisms (coagulopathy).

== Causes ==
Factors that increase the risk of kidney cancer include smoking, high blood pressure, obesity, faulty genes, a family history of kidney cancer in first-degree relatives, having kidney disease that needs dialysis, being infected with hepatitis C, and previous treatment for testicular or cervical cancer.

Also, other possible risk factors, such as kidney stones, are being investigated.

About 25–30% of kidney cancer is attributed to smoking. Smokers have a 1.3 times higher risk of developing kidney cancer compared to nonsmokers. Moreover, an increased risk of cancer development is dose-dependent; men who smoke more than 20 cigarettes per day have twice the risk. Likewise, women who smoke more than 20 cigarettes per day have 1.5 times the risk of nonsmoking women. After 10 years of smoking cessation, a substantial reduction is seen in the risk of developing kidney cancer.

== Diagnosis ==
Due to the increase in ultrasound and CT imaging for nonspecific abdominal complaints, kidney masses are frequently incidentally diagnosed on medical imaging. More than 60% of renal cell carcinomas (the most common type of kidney cancer) are diagnosed incidentally by abdominal imaging for nonspecific abdominal complaints.

Kidney masses can be classified by the nature of the cells in the growth, or by their appearance on radiography. The term cancer refers to a malignant tumor, which is an uncontrolled growth of abnormal cells, in this case being a kidney tumor.

=== Medical imaging ===
Since the differential diagnosis for a kidney tumor is large, the first step is to characterize the mass with medical imaging to assess whether it is benign or malignant. Ultrasonography is sometimes used to evaluate a suspected kidney mass, as it can characterize cystic and solid kidney masses without radiation exposure and at relatively low cost. Radiologically, kidney tumors are grouped based on appearance into simple cystic, complex cystic, or solid. The most important differentiating feature of a cancerous and noncancerous tumor on imaging is enhancement. Simple cysts, which are defined by strict criteria, are safe to be monitored if the person does not have any symptoms. However, all masses that are not clearly simple cysts should be further evaluated and confirmed by alternate imaging techniques.

Computed tomography (CT) of the abdomen administered with and without intravenous contrast is the ideal imaging method to diagnose and determine the stage of kidney cancer. Tentative evidence indicates that iodinated contrast agents may cause worsening of kidney function in people with chronic kidney disease with a glomerular filtration rate less than 45 ml/min/1.73 m^{2} and should therefore be given cautiously to such persons.

Abdominal magnetic resonance imaging (MRI) is an alternative imaging method that can be used to characterize and stage a kidney mass, and may be suggested if contrast material cannot be given. MRI can also evaluate the inferior vena cava if the mass is suspected to extend outside the kidney.

Since the lungs are the most common organ for kidney cancer metastasis, a chest X-ray or CT scan may be ordered based on the person's risk for such disease.

=== Histopathologic classification ===
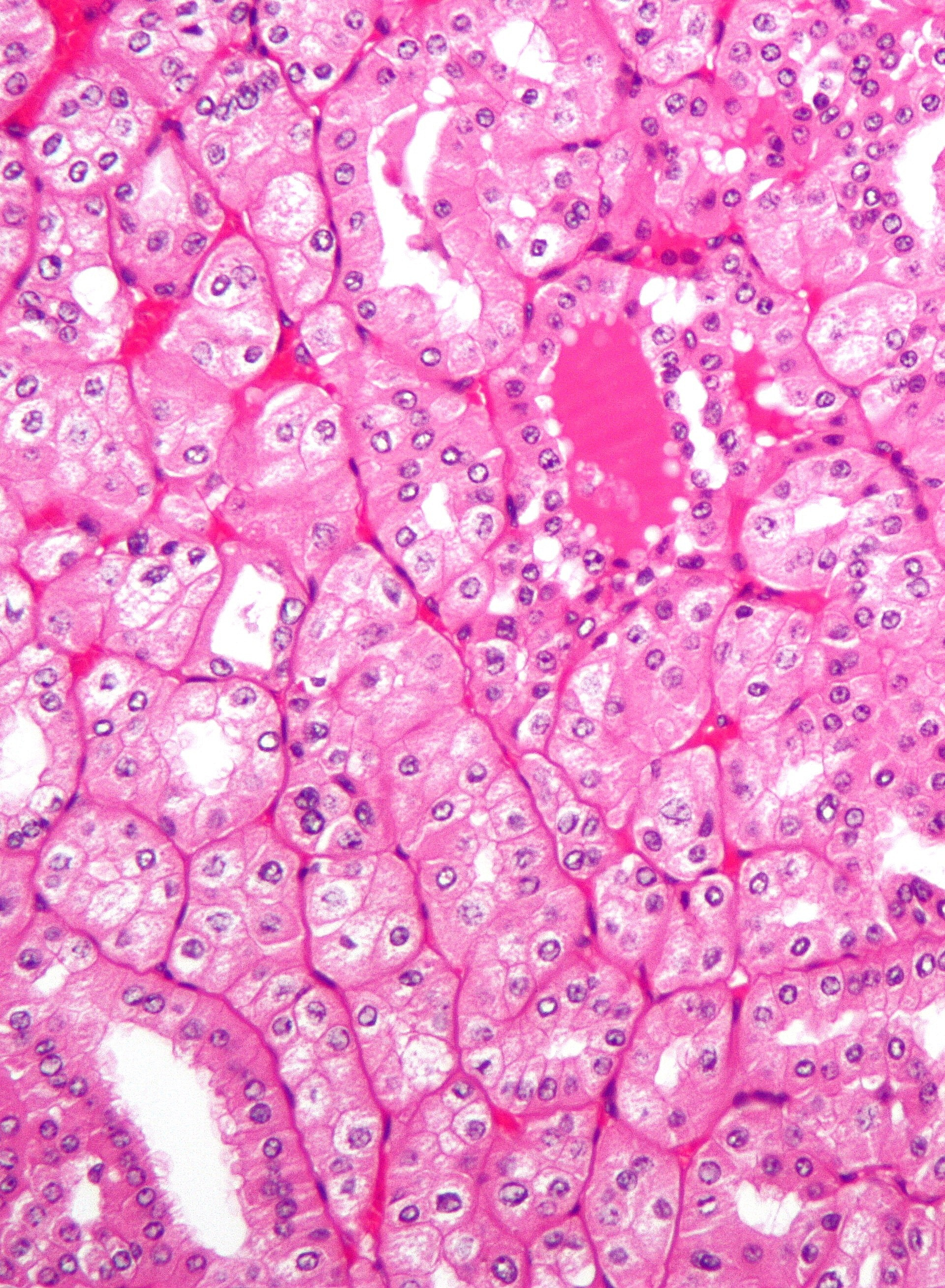
Micrograph of a kidney cancer (chromophobe RCC, oncocytic variant), that may be challenging to differentiate from a benign kidney tumor (renal oncocytoma), H&E stain

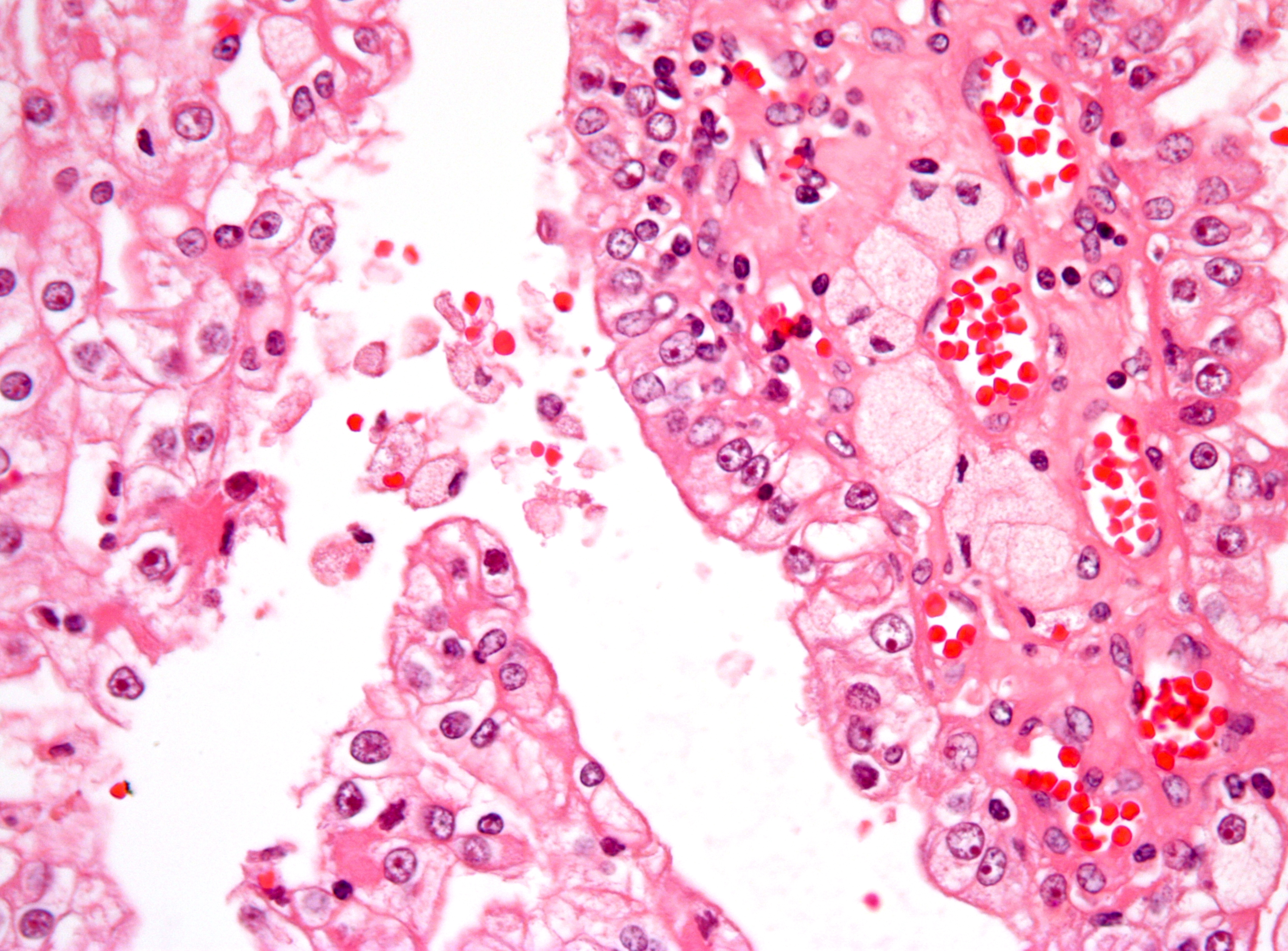
Micrograph of papillary RCC, a form of kidney cancer, H&E stain

The most common type of kidney malignancy is renal cell carcinoma (RCC), which is thought to originate from cells in the proximal convoluted tubule of the nephron. Another type of kidney cancer, although less common, is transitional cell cancer (TCC) or urothelial carcinoma of the renal pelvis. The renal pelvis is the part of the kidney that collects urine and drains it into the ureter. The cells that line the renal pelvis are called transitional cellsor sometimes urothelial cells. The transitional/urothelial cells in the renal pelvis are the same type of cells that line the ureter and bladder. For this reason, TCC of the renal pelvis is distinct from RCC and is thought to behave more like bladder cancer. Other rare types of kidney cancers that can arise from the urothelial cells of the renal pelvis are squamous cell carcinoma and renal adenocarcinoma.

Other causes of kidney cancer include:

- Sarcomas, such as leiomyosarcoma, liposarcoma, angiosarcoma, clear-cell sarcoma, and rhabdomyosarcoma, have occurred in the kidney. Renal anaplastic sarcoma has also been described in the 21st century.
- Metastatic tumors can come from a distant organ.
- Lymphoma
- Carcinoid tumor of the renal pelvis
- Carcinosarcoma
- Inverted urothelial papilloma was traditionally regarded as a benign growth, but the risk may be increased for recurrence and transformation to TCC.
- Wilms' tumor, an embryonic tumor, is the most common type of kidney cancer in children.
- Mesoblastic nephroma, although rare, also typically presents in childhood.

RCC has been further divided into subtypes based on histological features and genetic abnormalities. The 2004 WHO Classification of the Renal Tumors of the Adults describes these categories:

- Clear cell RCC is the most common type, making up 80% of cases.
- Multilocular clear cell RCC
- Papillary RCC
- Chromophobe RCC
- Carcinoma of the collecting ducts of Bellini
- Renal medullary carcinoma
- Xp11 translocation carcinoma
- Carcinoma associated with neuroblastoma
- Mucinous tubular and spindle cell carcinoma
- Mixed epithelial stromal tumor

Tumors that are considered benign include angiomyolipoma, oncocytoma, reninoma (juxtaglomerular cell tumor), and renal adenoma.

=== Immunohistochemistry ===
Typical immunohistochemistry for various kidney cancer types:
	PAX8	CD10	CAIX	RCC	Melanocytic markers	Vimentin	CK7	HMWCK	CD117 / KIT	AMACR	GATA3
Clear cell RCC	+	+	+ (box-like)	+	-	+	-	-	-	-/+	-
Papillary RCC	+	+	+/-	+	-	+	+	-	-	+	-
Clear cell papillary RCC	+	-	+ (cup-like)	+/-	-	+	+	+/-	-	-	+/-
Chromophobe RCC	+	-/+	-	+/-	-	-	+	-	+	-	+/-
Oncocytoma	+	-/+	-	-	-	-	focal	-	+	-/+	-
Angiomyolipoma	-	-	-/+	-	+	-/+	-	-	-	-	-
Collecting duct carcinoma	+	-	-/+	-	-	+	+/-	+	-	-	-
Tubulocystic carcinoma	+	+	+/-	+	-	+/-	-/+	-	-	+/-	-
Translocation RCC	+	+/-	-/+	+/-	+/-	+	-	-	-	+/-	-
MTSCC	+	-/+	-/+	+/-	-	+	+	-/+	-	+/-	-
Legend: + = usually positive; +/- = frequently positive; -/+ = occasionally positive; - = usually negative

=== Laboratory studies ===
People with suspected kidney cancer should also have their kidney function evaluated to help determine treatment options. Blood tests to determine kidney function include a comprehensive metabolic panel and a complete blood count. In addition, these tests help understand the overall health of the person, which can be affected by metastatic disease (i.e., outside of the kidney). For example, liver or bone involvement could result in abnormal liver enzymes, electrolyte abnormalities, or anemia. A urine sample should also be collected for urinalysis.

=== Biopsy ===
The utility of renal mass biopsy lies in that it can confirm malignancy with reliability, can direct therapy based on diagnosis, and can provide drainage.

Once imaging has been completed, renal mass biopsy should be considered if the likelihood is high that the mass is hematologic, metastatic, inflammatory, or infectious. These types of lesions would not be managed surgically, differing from cancer originating from the kidney. Cancer originating outside the kidney and lymphoma are managed systemically.

A biopsy can accurately diagnose malignancy, but it cannot diagnose benign disease reliably. In other words, if the biopsy shows cancer, there is a 99.8% chance that kidney cancer is present (positive predictive value= 99.8%). A negative biopsy does not rule out a diagnosis of cancer.

=== Staging ===
The staging process helps determine the extent and spread of the disease, but only RCC can be staged. The first step follows the TNM staging system proposed by the Union International Contre le Cancer that is widely used for cancers in other organs. The TNM staging system classifies the primary tumor (T), lymph nodes (N), and distant metastasis (M) of the disease. The American Joint Committee on Cancer (AJCC) published a Cancer Staging Manual revision in 2010 that describes the values of TMN for RCC.

Lymph node involvement is classified as either regional lymph node metastasis (N1) or no involvement (N0). Similarly, M1 describes distant metastasis, while M0 describes no distant metastasis.

The primary tumor of rcc is categorized in the table below, as according to the AJCC's Cancer Staging Manual 8th Edition:

Stage	TNM	Description
	Tx, N0, M0	Tumor cannot be assessed
	T0, N0, M0	No evidence of primary tumor
I	T1, N0, M0	Tumor ≤7 cm; limited to kidney
I	T1a, N0, M0	Tumor ≤4 cm; limited to kidney
I	T1b, N0, M0	Tumor 4-≤7 cm; limited to kidney
II	T2, N0, M0	Tumor >7 cm; limited to kidney
II	T2a, N0, M0	Tumor 7-≤10 cm; limited to kidney
II	T2b, N0, M0	Tumor >10 cm; limited to kidney
III	T3, N0, M0	Tumor extends to major veins or perinephric tissue, but not into ipsilateral adrenal gland nor beyond Gerota's fascia
III	T3a, N0, M0	Tumor grossly extends into renal vein or its segmental branches, or tumor invades the pelvicalyceal system, or tumor invades perirenal and/or renal sinus fat, but not beyond Gerota's fascia
III	T3b, N0, M0	Tumor grossly extends into vena cava below the diaphragm
III	T3c, N0, M0	Tumor grossly extends into vena cava above the diaphragm or invades the wall of the vena cava
III	T1-T3, N1, M0	The main tumor can be any size and may be outside the kidney, but it has not spread beyond Gerota's fascia. The cancer has spread to regional lymph nodes (N1) but has not spread to distant lymph nodes or other organs (M0).
IV	T4, any N, M0	Tumor invades beyond Gerota's fascia
IV	Any T, any N, M1	Tumor has spread to distant lymph nodes and/or other organs.

The lungs are the most common site for metastasis; other common sites include bone, brain, liver, adrenal gland, and distant lymph nodes.

Stage 1 kidney cancer

Stage 2 kidney cancer

Stage 3 kidney cancer

Stage 4 kidney cancer

== Treatment ==
Treatment for kidney cancer depends on the type and stage of the disease. Surgery is the most common treatment, as kidney cancer does not often respond to chemotherapy and radiation therapy. Surgical complexity can be estimated by the RENAL Nephrometry Scoring System. If the cancer has not spread, it usually can be removed by surgery. In some cases, this involves removing the whole kidney, but most tumors are amenable to partial removal to eradicate the tumor and preserve the remaining normal portion of the kidney. Surgery is not always possible; for example, the patient may have other medical conditions that prevent it or the cancer may have spread around the body and may not be removable. If the cancer cannot be treated with surgery, other techniques such as freezing the tumor or treating it with high temperatures may be used. These are not yet used as standard treatments, though, for kidney cancer. Recently, evidence stemming from the KEYNOTE-564 study has indicated the potential use of systemic therapy in the adjuvant setting has promising results. Patients exhibiting specific clear cell RCC tumor characteristics and having undergone treatment with pembrolizumab for 17 cycles (around 1 year) had significant improvement in disease-free survival, but the study has yet to yield conclusive findings in relation to overall survival.

Other treatment options include biological therapies such as everolimus, torisel, nexavar, sutent, and axitinib and the use of immunotherapy, including interferon and interleukin-2. Immunotherapy is successful in 10 to 15% of people. Sunitinib is the current standard of care in the adjuvant setting along with pazopanib; these treatments are often followed by everolimus, axitinib, and sorafenib. Immune checkpoint inhibitors are also in trials for kidney cancer, and some have gained approval for medical use.

In the second-line setting, nivolumab demonstrated an overall survival advantage in advanced clear RCC over everolimus in 2015 and was approved by the FDA. Cabozantinib also demonstrated an overall survival benefit over everolimus and was approved by the FDA as a second-line treatment in 2016. Lenvatinib in combination with everolimus was approved in 2016 for patients who have had exactly one prior line of angiogenic therapy.

In Wilms' tumor, chemotherapy, radiotherapy, and surgery are the accepted treatments, depending on the stage of the disease at diagnossis.

=== Children ===
Most kidney cancers reported in children are Wilms' tumors, which can begin to grow when a fetus is still developing in the uterus and may not cause problems until the child is a few years old. Wilms' tumor is most common in children under the age of 5, but can rarely be diagnosed in older children or in adults. The causes of most Wilms' tumors are still unclear. The most common symptoms are swelling of the abdomen and blood in the urine.

== Epidemiology ==
Around 208,500 new cases of kidney cancer are diagnosed in the world each year, accounting for just under 2% of all cancers. The highest rates are recorded in North America and the lowest rates in Asia and Africa.

Lifestyle risk factors

Certain lifestyle factors have been associated with the development of renal cancer, although not all of them can be considered definitive causes. These include smoking, chemical carcinogens, radiation, viruses, diet and obesity, hypertension, diuretics, and alcohol consumption. Only a small percentage of kidney cancer cases have been linked to genetic factors. With obesity listed as one of the risk factors, daily physical activity and engaging in a healthy diet are proven to lower the rates of developing kidney cancer in the future.

Age

The incidence rate of renal cancer increases with the age, with 75 being the approximate age of the peak incidence rate, as of 2018. However, nearly one-half of all cases are diagnosed before the age of 65. In both male and female children, renal tumors represent 2 to 6% of kidney cancer, with Wilms' tumor being the most common.

Sex

The incidence of kidney cancer is two times greater in men than in women, which is thought to be due to biological differences. Mortality rates typically decrease more rapidly in women compared to men.

International variations

Incidence rates of kidney cancer can vary throughout the world. As of 2018, the Czech Republic and Lithuania have the highest incidence rate of kidney cancer worldwide, with an age-standardized rate of 21.9/100,000 in males (Czech Republic) and 18.7/100,000 in males (Lithuania.) China, Thailand, and African countries (low-risk) have incidence rates less than two in 100,000.

Since the early 2000s, Austria and Poland have been the only countries to report a decrease in kidney cancer rates.

Race

Race and ethnicity may be a factor in the distribution of kidney cancer around the United States. The rates are higher in black men and Hispanics, an average rate for American Indians, and low rates in Asians in the United States. Black people with kidney cancer have lower mortality rates than Caucasians in the United States.

Screening

Accessibility for cancer screening is not very common due to high expenses. Improving cancer registries can improve care to those who have kidney cancer, and can decrease death rates. Safe and dependable treatment is key with the screening and treatment, which is not always the case in developing nations.

=== United States ===
The U.S. National Institutes of Health, for 2025, estimate around 80,980 new cases of kidney cancer and 14,510 deaths from the disease.

=== Europe ===
The most recent estimates of incidence of kidney cancer suggest about 63,300 new cases annually in the EU25. In Europe, kidney cancer accounts for nearly 3% of all cancer cases. Kidney cancer is the eighth-most-common cancer in the UK (around 10,100 people were diagnosed with the disease in 2011), and it is the 14th-most-common cause of cancer death (around 4,300 people died in 2012).
