= Integrin beta 6 =

Protein-coding gene in the species Homo sapiens

ITGB6

Identifiers
- Aliases: ITGB6, AI1H, Integrin, beta 6, integrin subunit beta 6
- External IDs: OMIM: 147558; MGI: 96615; GeneCards: ITGB6
Available structures
PDB	Ortholog search: PDBe RCSB
PDB	List of PDB id codes 4UM8, 4UM9

Gene location (Human)
Chr.	Chromosome 2 (human)
Band	2q24.2	Start	160,099,667 bp
Band	2q24.2	End	160,200,313 bp

Gene location (Mouse)
Chr.	Chromosome 2 (mouse)
Band	2 C1.1- C1.2|2 34.81 cM	Start	60,428,636 bp
Band	2 C1.1- C1.2|2 34.81 cM	End	60,552,987 bp
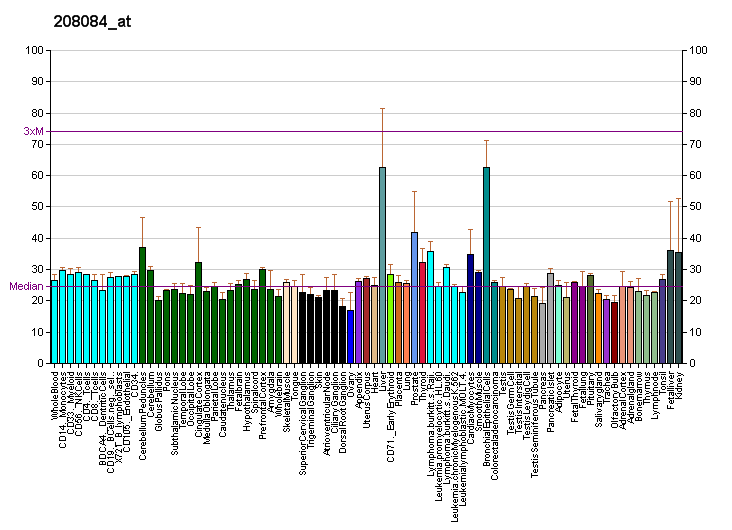

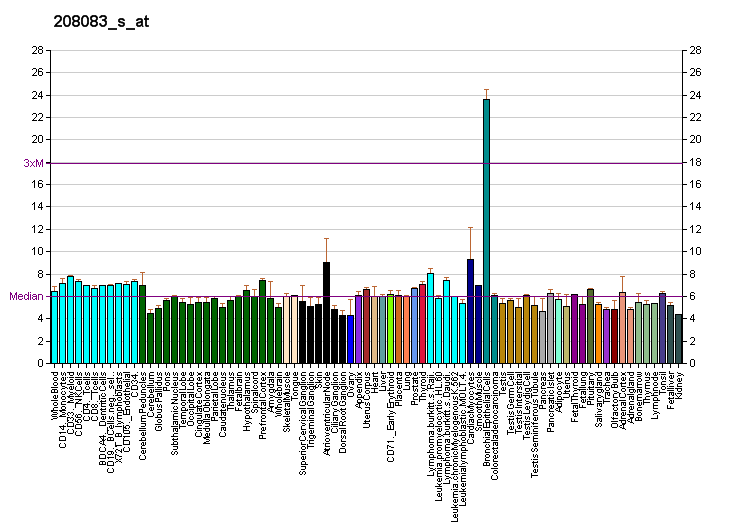
RNA expression pattern
Bgee	Human / Mouse (ortholog); Top expressed in: visceral pleura; biceps brachii; Skeletal muscle tissue of rectus abdominis; Skeletal muscle tissue of biceps brachii; palpebral conjunctiva; lower lobe of lung; vastus lateralis muscle; body of tongue; muscle of thigh; lactiferous duct / Top expressed in: right kidney; proximal tubule; epithelium of stomach; triceps brachii muscle; extraocular muscle; vastus lateralis muscle; human kidney; sternocleidomastoid muscle; temporal muscle; digastric muscle; More reference expression data
BioGPS	More reference expression data
Gene ontology
Molecular function	integrin binding; virus receptor activity; protein binding; signaling receptor activity
Cellular component	integral component of membrane; integrin complex; receptor complex; plasma membrane; membrane; external side of plasma membrane; focal adhesion; integrin alphav-beta6 complex; nucleoplasm; centrosome; cell junction; cell surface
Biological process	integrin-mediated signaling pathway; viral entry into host cell; cell-matrix adhesion; inflammatory response; cell adhesion; extracellular matrix organization; viral process; cell adhesion mediated by integrin; cell migration; regulation of transforming growth factor beta activation
Sources:Amigo / QuickGO
Orthologs
Databases	NCBI: entry; OMA: entry
Species	Human	Mouse
Entrez	3694	16420
Ensembl	ENSG00000115221	ENSMUSG00000026971
UniProt	P18564	Q9Z0T9
RefSeq (mRNA)	NM_000888; NM_001282353; NM_001282354; NM_001282355; NM_001282388 NM_001282389; NM_001282390	NM_001159564; NM_021359
RefSeq (protein)	NP_000879; NP_001269282; NP_001269283; NP_001269284; NP_001269317 NP_001269318; NP_001269319	NP_001153036; NP_067334
Location (UCSC)	Chr 2: 160.1 – 160.2 Mb	Chr 2: 60.43 – 60.55 Mb
PubMed search
- Wikidata
View/Edit Human	View/Edit Mouse

Integrin beta-6 is a protein that in humans is encoded by the ITGB6 gene. It is the β6 subunit of the integrin αvβ6. Integrins are αβ heterodimeric glycoproteins which span the cell's membrane, integrating the outside and inside of the cell. Integrins bind to specific extracellular proteins in the extracellular matrix or on other cells and subsequently transduce signals intracellularly to affect cell behaviour. One α and one β subunit associate non-covalently to form 24 unique integrins found in mammals. While some β integrin subunits partner with multiple α subunits, β6 associates exclusively with the αv subunit. Thus, the function of ITGB6 is entirely associated with the integrin αvβ6. The dimer αvβ6-integrin is expressed by epithelial cells and frequently found in high density on the surface of carcinomas (synonymous to cancers of epithelial origin). This enables targeting of these cancers with pharmaceuticals and functional imaging agents, such as cancer cell specific positron emission tomography (PET) imaging using the αvβ6-integrin targeted radiotracer ^{68}Ga-Trivehexin.

== Discovery ==
The β6 subunit and ITGB6 sequence was discovered by Professor Dean Sheppard and colleagues at the University of California, San Francisco in the early 1990s in guinea pig cells. Further investigation by research groups from the University of Madrid and University of Auckland found that ITGB6 was located on chromosome 2q at position 24.2.

In the past decade, significant research has been performed toward identifying the location of regions within the ITGB6 gene which both promote and suppress ITGB6 expression. Of note, binding regions for transcription factors STAT3 and C/EBPα were found, and basic normal cell expression of ITGB6 is thought to be regulated primarily by these proteins. Other transcription factors such as Ets-1 and Smad3 have also been shown to increase ITGB6 expression, while Elk1 binding is able to decrease expression. It is also known that ITGB6 expression is regulated epigenetically via histone acetylation.

It is also known that αvβ6 expression is regulated post-transcriptionally. ITGB6 mRNA is characteristically 'weak', meaning it is less likely to be translated than 'strong' mRNA. eIF4E is a protein which binds to 'weak' mRNA to upregulate translation of the protein. Disruption of eIF4E expression results in a significantly reduced expression of ITGB6.

== Mouse models ==
The first ITGB6-knockout mouse model was developed in 1996. The mice grew normally, with no difference in wound healing ability. However, there was a significant amount of inflammation in the skin and lungs. This was the observation eventually leading to the discovery that αvβ6 activates TGF-β1, as the mice had a similar phenotype to TGF-β1 deficient mice. The mice also developed temporary baldness, possibly due to the role αvβ6 plays in hair follicle regeneration.

While both TGF-β-/- and itgb6-/- mice have many similar characteristics, TGF-β1 deficient mice suffer from poorer health and symptoms not observed in itgb6-/- mice. This is because TGF-β1 can still be activated by other proteins such as Thrombospondin-1. In itgb6/thrombospondin 1 (tsp-1) double-null mice, there is a higher incidence of inflammation more consistent with the TGF-β1 null mice phenotype. Additionally, this study observed that the itgb6-/- mice developed many more benign and malignant tumours compared to both the wild type and tsp-1-/- mice.

Studies with longer term follow up of itgb6-/- mice observed an eventual development of emphysema. Matrix metallopeptidase 12 (MMP12) is an enzyme strongly associated with the development of emphysema, and was expressed 200-fold higher compared to the normal mice in alveolar macrophages. The mice also had abnormally large alveoli which worsened as the mice aged.

Another consistent observation in itgb6-/- mice is periodontitis. αvβ6 is expressed in the junctional epithelium of the gums, and is involved in the adhesion of the gingiva to the teeth. Incomplete adhesion of the gums to the teeth can cause 'pockets' to form which are prone to infection, resulting in chronic periodontal disease. Some mice also develop amelogenesis imperfecta, a disorder causing the teeth to develop abnormally.

== Function ==
Integrin αvβ6 is found exclusively on epithelial cells. In most resting normal cells, little ITGB6 is produced, however the highest levels are found in the stomach, gall bladder and lung. ITGB6 levels increase in cells remodelling tissues so αvβ6 expression is increased in development, wound healing, but also in fibrosis and cancer.

The principal function of αvβ6 is the activation of cytokine transforming growth factor-b1 (TGF-β1). Latent-TGF-β1 is bound to the extracellular matrix, covered by its pro-peptide latency associated peptide (LAP). αvβ6 binds LAP, and through cytoskeletal force releases TGF-β1. TGF-β1 regulates multiple processes including cell proliferation, differentiation, angiogenesis, epithelial-mesenchymal-transition (EMT) and immune suppression. These processes combine to heal wounds but when uncontrolled can promote tissue pathologies.

== Clinical significance ==
While αvβ6 promotes normal functions such as wound repair, excess αvβ6 production promotes diseases such fibrosis and cancer. High αvβ6 expression in fibrosis and cancer is usually associated with a poorer prognosis.

=== Fibrosis ===
Fibrosis occurs in response to chronic tissue insult and results in the deposit of excess collagen by activated fibroblasts in the matrix resulting in hardening of tissue. Fibroblasts are mesenchymal cells in all tissues that maintain the normal tissue matrix. When they become activated, as occurs in wound healing, they secrete extra matrix proteins and cytokines to promote wound repair. Chronic activation of fibroblasts can result in diseases such as pulmonary fibrosis, where the hardening and thickening of the lung tissue makes it difficult for patients to breathe.

A major driver of fibroblast activation is TGF-β and as αvβ6 expression is increased in response to tissue damage, and is a principal activator of TGF-β, it is therefore a potential drug target in treating fibrosis. αvβ6 can promote fibrosis in kidney, lung and skin, despite αvβ6 being almost absent in their healthy equivalents.

=== Cancer ===
Increased αvβ6 expression occurs in up to one third of solid tumours including breast cancer, lung cancer and pancreatic cancer. Because it is not found on most normal cells, it is a potential therapeutic and imaging target in cancer research. When αvβ6 is over-expressed in cancers it often correlates with poorer overall survival.

Integrin αvβ6 promotes tumour progression in multiple ways. Through its cytoplasmic tail it promotes cancer cell migration, increased secretion of matrix metalloproteinases (MMPs) that can degrade the ECM, leading to increased invasion. Intracellular signals generated by αvβ6 increase pErk and pAkt that increase cell proliferation and survival, respectively. Through its extracellular domain it activates TGF-β1 which increases processes that aid cancer progression including angiogenesis, activation of fibroblasts (now called Cancer Associated Fibroblasts), immune suppression. and epithelial-to-mesenchymal transition (EMT) EMT is the process by which epithelial cells adopt a mesenchymal phenotype, breaking away from neighbouring epithelial cells and becoming more migratory, a crucial stage in the development of cancer. In cancer, this promotes invasion of the local healthy tissue and ultimately spread to other parts of the body. αvβ6 can be found in cells which are undergoing EMT.

=== ITGB6 deficiency ===
Recorded cases of people who are ITGB6 deficient are rare. The first reported case was in 2013 following whole genome sequencing of a 7-year-old girl with amelogenesis imperfecta, a disease affecting the development of teeth. While multiple patients with amelogenesis imperfecta have since been found to have ITGB6 mutations, there were no other clinical symptoms reported in the majority of these cases.

In 2016 a family in Pakistan were found to have dysfunctional ITGB6 resulting in alopecia, intellectual disabilities and symptoms consistent with amelogenesis imperfecta. The clinical phenotype of these cases does not fully reflect the phenotype observed in mouse models, and of note, there was no reference to any chronic inflammation or emphysema.

== Integrin αvβ6 as a drug target ==
=== Radiopharmaceuticals ===
Particularly its overexpression by many types of carcinomas (synonymous to cancers of epithelial origin) has prompted research on radiotracers binding to αvβ6. Such tracers, typically consisting of a radioactive atom (referred to as radiolabel) and a biomolecule that selectively binds to αvβ6, are intended to accumulate in tissues with a high fraction of αvβ6-integrin expressing cells (including but not limited to carcinoma cells). Depending on the type of radiolabel, this approach enables imaging of the distribution of αvβ6-integrin in a patient's body by means of positron emission tomography (PET), single-photon emission computed tomography (SPECT), or scintigraphy.

As of January 2025, there are no approved radiopharmaceuticals targeting αvβ6-integrin. However, several αvβ6-integrin targeted radiotracers are currently being developed for clinical use. First-in-human application of different αvβ6 radiotracers has demonstrated that ^{68}Ga-Trivehexin, a peptide labeled with the positron emitter Gallium-68, performed especially well in detecting pancreatic cancer, showing high uptake in tumors and low background in the gastrointestinal tract (GI tract). ^{68}Ga-Trivehexin has been experimentally used for clinical PET imaging of pancreatic ductal adenocarcinoma, of tonsillar carcinoma metastasized to the brain, of bronchial mucoepidermoid carcinoma, of disseminated parathyroid adenoma in the context of the diagnosis of primary hyperparathyroidism (PHPT), and of papillary thyroid carcinoma.

== Interactions ==
Integrin beta 6 has been shown to interact with FHL2.

== See also ==
- Sigvotatug vedotin
