= Mucinous tubular and spindle cell carcinoma =

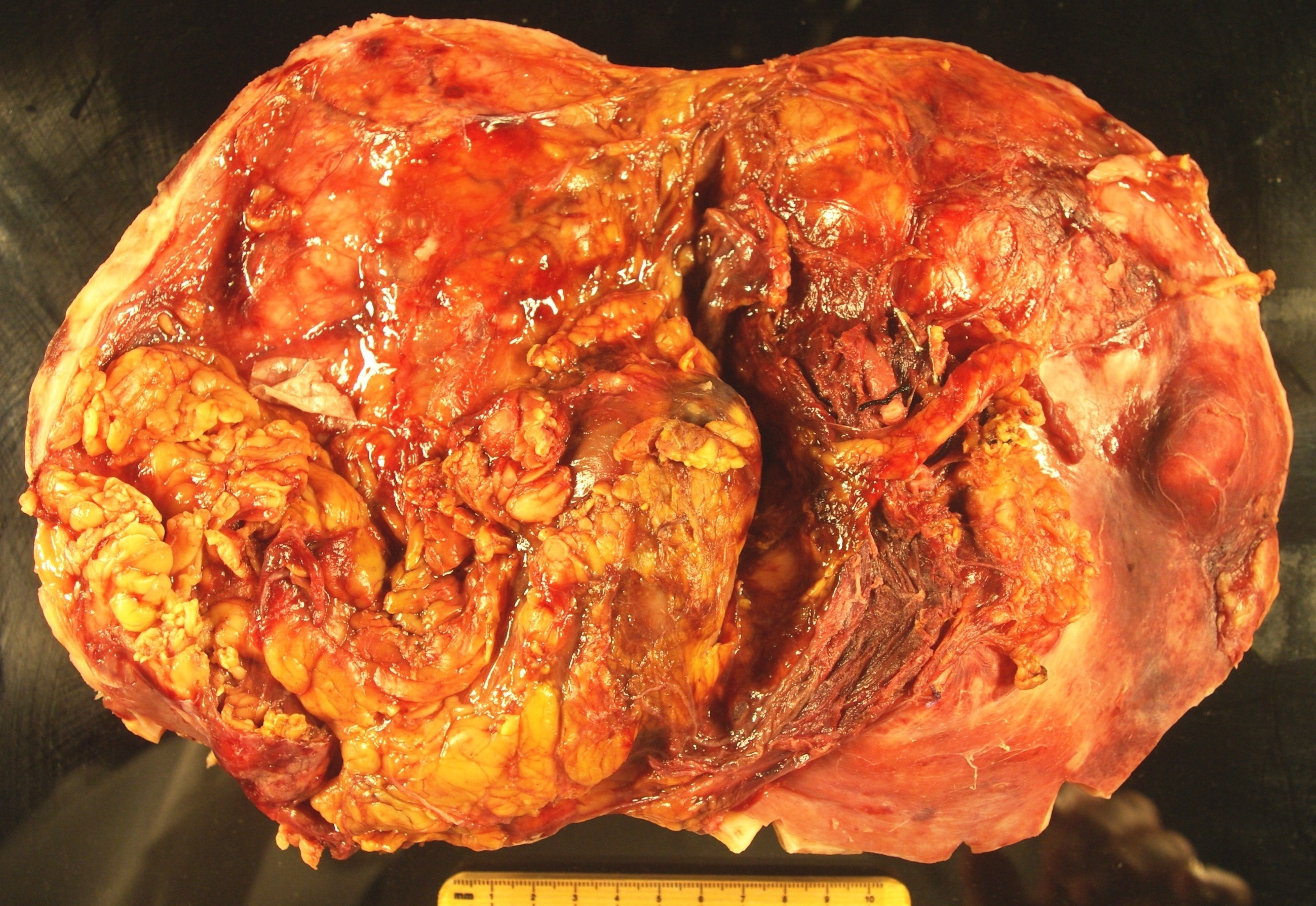
- Specialty: Oncology/nephrology

Mucinous tubular and spindle cell carcinoma (MTSCC) is a rare subtype of renal cell carcinoma (RCC), that is included in the 2004 WHO classification of RCC. MTSCC is a rare neoplasm and is considered a low-grade entity. It may be a variant of papillary RCC. This tumor occurs throughout life (age range 17–82 years) and is more frequent in females.

== Genetics ==
MTSCC does not have the characteristic molecular aberrations of papillary RCC: gains of chromosome 7 and 17 and loss of chromosome Y.

== Diagnosis ==
MTSCC has a gross appearance close to papillary RCC. Microscopically, it has three histologic components: mucin, tumor cells forming tubules, and spindle cells. It is characterized by the proliferation of cuboidal and spindle cells arranged in tubular or sheet-like arrays, typically with a mucinous or myxoid background.

=== Immunohistochemical staining ===
IHC close to papillary RCC profile: CK7+, AMCAR+, CD10-.

=== Morphological variants ===
MTSCC can be a difficult diagnosis due to its morphologic heterogeneity. Several morphological variants have been described, as the ‘‘mucin-poor variants’’, showing a predominance of tubular or spindle cell components and only minimal pale mucinous background. Focal papillations or papillary cores and foamy histiocytes can also be seen, creating confusion with papillary RCC. Helpful features for diagnosis are bland cytologic features and adjacent tubular and spindle cell components. Focal areas of clear cells and oncocytic cells can also be present.

=== Differential diagnosis ===
Papillary renal cell carcinoma: MTSCC may have some morphologic similarities to the more common papillary renal cell carcinoma (papillary RCC), particularly the basophilic tumors with prominent solid growth pattern with sarcomatoid transformation.

== Prognosis ==
MTSCC is of low-grade malignancy. Some rare cases of lymph node metastasis and recurrence have been described. Two cases of MTSCC with sarcomatoid change have been described, one with widespread metastasis to distant organs, including lung and bone.

A spindled component is characteristic of MTSCC, but the presence of significant pleomorphism with prominent nucleoli and mitotic activity, and necrosis should raise concern for a sarcomatoid change. Microscopic necrosis can be seen focally in MTSCC. Its significance is unknown. The presence of any necrosis should be mentioned in the pathological report.
