= Lymph node metastasis =

Spread of cancer to the lymph nodes

Lymph node metastasis is the spread (metastasis) of cancer cells into a lymph node.

Lymph node metastasis is different from lymphoma. Lymphoma is a cancer of lymph node, rather than cancer in the lymph node, because lymphoma originates from the lymph node itself, instead of originating elsewhere (e.g., the breast or colon) and spreading to the lymph nodes.

== Pathology ==
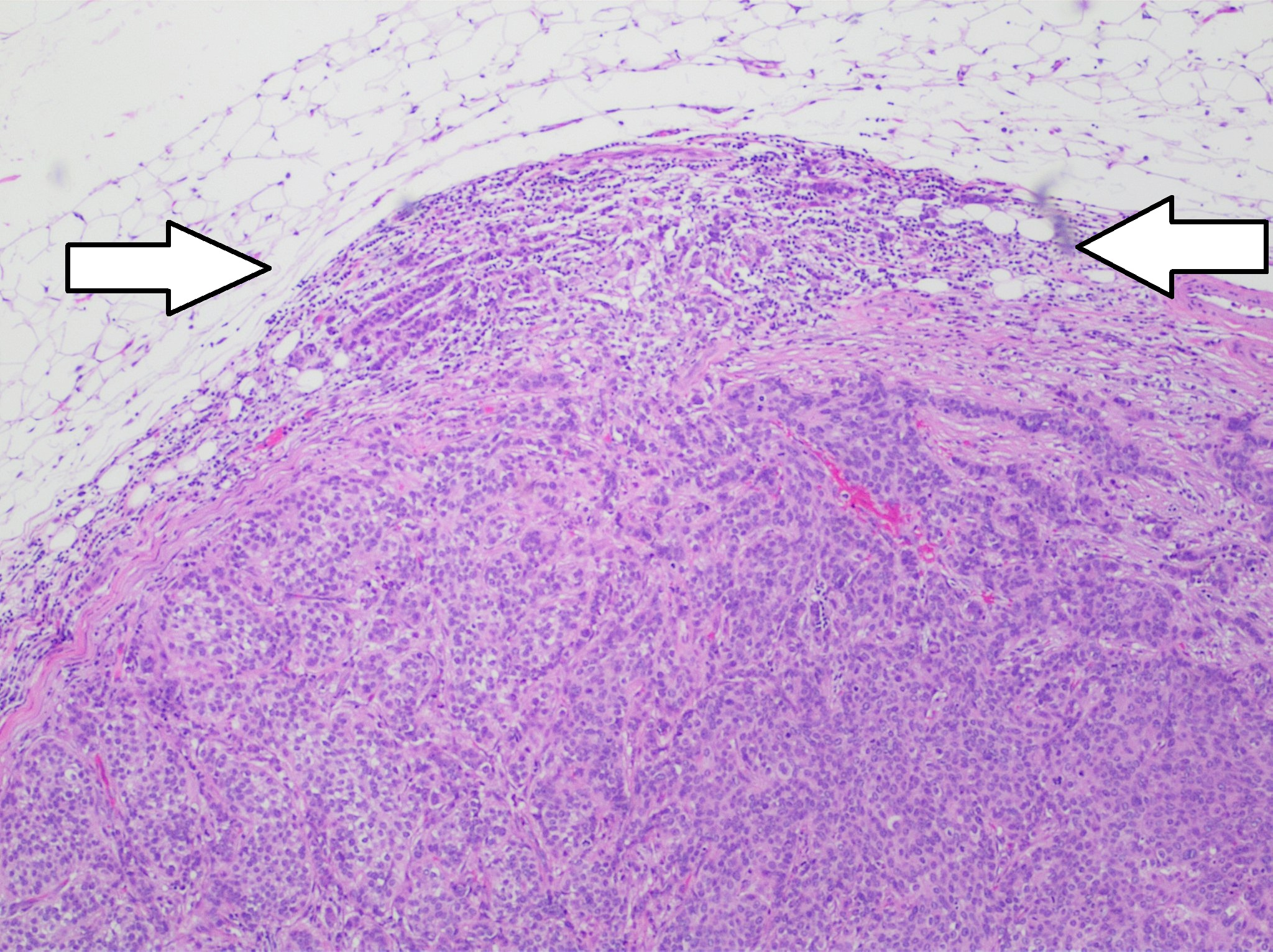
Histopathology of a lymph node with metastatic invasive ductal carcinoma from the breast, H&E stain, with the presence of extranodal (or "extracapsular") extension (arrows), as tumor outside the fibrous capsule of the lymph node.

Generally, metastases form first in the lymph nodes that are closest to the primary tumor. This is because the lymphatic fluid (lymph) of the cancerous organ or tissue flows first to these nearby lymph nodes. The tumor cells reach the lymph nodes via this lymphatic pathway, where they remain and proliferate. These spreading cancer cells grow in the lymph nodes, which causes the affected lymph nodes to get bigger.

Lymphogenic metastasis is a type of regional metastases. This is in contrast to distant metastases, such as bone metastases, liver metastases or brain metastases, which could come from any part of the body. Tumor cells that grow in the lymph nodes can later detach from the lymph node metastases, enter the bloodstream, and lead to distant metastases via hematogenous spread. However, the science is not settled on this point, and there is disagreement about whether metastases can metastasize themselves.

The probability of metastasis in the lymph nodes depends on the density of the lymphatic vessels in the area of the primary tumor. For example, hypopharyngeal or nasopharyngeal carcinomas metastasize extremely quickly to the nearby tissue areas, which are rich in lymphatic vessels.

== Classification ==
Lymph node metastases are usually classified according to the TNM staging system (T = tumor, N = nodes = lymph nodes, M = metastasis). N0 means that there are no signs of lymph node involvement, and the numbers indicate increasing levels of spread to lymph nodes.

However, staging systems varies according the type of primary tumor.

== Frequency ==
The probability of metastasis to lymph nodes depends on the nature of the primary tumor. In the case of sarcomas, for example, lymph nodes are only very rarely affected. In the case of the much more common carcinomas, especially for the particularly aggressive types, the probability is considerably higher. Above all, however, it depends on the local spread of the primary tumor, its infiltration level, and the tumor size. In many carcinomas, the first metastases are found in the lymph nodes. These include, for example, pancreatic cancer, head and neck cancer and melanoma. In the majority of breast cancer cases, too, the first metastases are found in the lymph nodes, specifically in the axillary lymph nodes.

== Symptoms and diagnosis ==
Lymph node metastases are usually painless. This contrasts with lymphadenitis (inflammation of the lymph nodes, such as due to a viral infection), in which the lymph nodes are both enlarged and painful when pressed on.

Enlarged lymph nodes can be identified by palpation (pressing on the spots to feel lumps under the skin). Sonography (ultrasound) can be used as a further diagnostic method. This is especially useful if the lymph nodes are located superficial enough to be detected and characterized by ultrasound, for example in the subcutaneous tissue like in the axilla (armpit). This is a common location for lymph node metastases from the breast or melanoma of the arm. However, some locations are less suitable for sonographic evaluation, for example mediastinal and hilar lymph nodes because of the deep location in the central thorax and the surrounding air-filled lung parenchyma. To evaluate thoracic lymph nodes, CT or PET/CT is the method of choice in most cases.

In some cases, lymph node metastases are the first symptom of cancer.

== Treatment ==
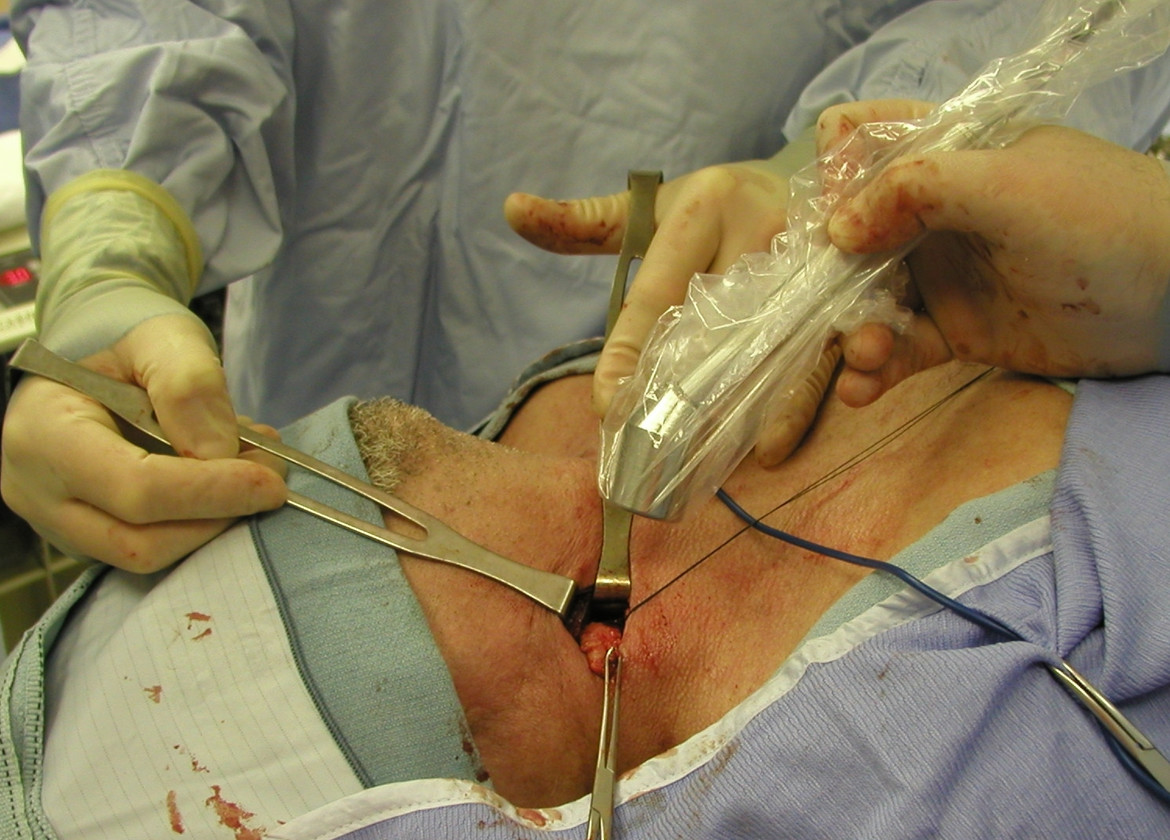
Lymphadenectomy of a lymph node in the neck

The treatment of the lymph node metastases is usually part of the treatment of the primary tumor. If the primary tumor is operable, all lymph nodes located in the lymphatic drainage area of the diseased organ are often removed. This procedure is called a lymphadenectomy (lymph node removal). With sentinel lymph nodes, a different concept is used in some cancers, specifically breast cancer and prostate cancer. The sentinel lymph node is the first lymph node in the drainage area of the tumor lymph. If this is not affected, the more distant lymph nodes are very likely tumor-free and do not have to be removed. The need to remove lymph node metastases is a controversial topic.
