= Tonsil carcinoma =

Tonsil cancer that has material basis in squamous cells

- Specialty: Oncology

Carcinoma of the tonsil is a type of squamous cell carcinoma. The tonsil is the most common site of squamous cell carcinoma in the oropharynx. It comprises 23.1% of all malignancies of the oropharynx. The tumors frequently present at advanced stages, and around 70% of patients present with metastasis to the cervical lymph nodes. . The most reported complaints include sore throat, otalgia or dysphagia. Some patients may complain of feeling the presence of a lump in the throat. Approximately 20% patients present with a node in the neck as the only symptom.

Main risk factors of developing carcinoma tonsil include tobacco smoking and regular intake of high amount of alcohol. It has also been linked to human papilloma virus (HPV type HPV16). Other risk factors include poor maintenance of oral hygiene, a genetic predisposition leading to inclination towards development of throat cancer, immunocompromised states (such as post solid-organ transplant), and chronic exposure to agents such as asbestos and perchloroethylene in certain occupations, radiation therapy and dietary factors.

== Signs and symptoms ==
The early lesions are usually asymptomatic. The patients presenting with an advanced stage of the disease comprises around 66–77% of the cases.

The most important signs include a lump in the neck when palpated and weight loss. People may also present with fatigue as a symptom.

The primary tumor does not have readily discernible signs or symptoms as they grow within the tonsillar capsule. It is difficult to notice anything suspicious on examination of the tonsil other than slight enlargement or the development of firmness around the area. The carcinoma may occur in one or more sites deep within the tonsillar crypts. It may be accompanied by the enlargement of the tonsil. The affected tonsil grows into the oropharyngeal space making it noticeable by the patient in the form of a neck mass mostly in the jugulodigastric region. As the tonsils consist of a rich network of lymphatics, the carcinoma may metastasize to the neck lymph nodes which many are cystic. Extension of tumor to skull or mediastinum can occur.

The additional symptoms include a painful throat, dysphagia, otalgia (due to cranial nerve involvement), foreign body sensation, bleeding, fixation of tongue (infiltration of deep muscles) and trismus (if the pterygoid muscle is involved in the parapharyngeal space).

On the other hand, the tumor may also present as a deep red or white fungating wound growing outwards, breaking the skin surface with a central ulceration. This wound-like ulcer fails to heal (non-healing) leading to bleeding and throat pain and other associated symptoms.

During biopsy, the lesion may show three signs: gritty texture, firmness and cystification owing to keratinization, fibrosis and necrosis respectively.

Cervical lymphadenopathy may be present.

== Cause ==
Smoking and alcohol abuse are the major risk factors. Viral causes have recently been taken under consideration as one of the risk factors. Viruses such as Epstein-Barr virus (EBV) (majorly involved in causing nasopharyngeal carcinoma) and human papilloma virus are included in this category. Chewing of betel nut (Areca catechu) quid has been directly associated to cause oral cancers. It has also been stated under the FDA poisonous plant data base by the U.S Food and Drug Administration An unbalanced diet, deficit in fruits and vegetables has shown to increase the risk of cancer.

== Pathophysiology ==
Direction of spread	Structures involved
Along Glossotonsillar sulcus	Base of tongue
Superior	Soft palate or nasopharynx
Laterally (Infiltrating through the constrictor muscle)	Pharyngeal space, Pterygoid musculature, Mandible
Superior spread through parapharyngeal space	Base of skull
Inferior	Lateral neck
Extensive spread in parapharyngeal space	Carotid artery, Carotid sheath

Metastasis to regional lymphnodes is common as the tonsil has a rich supply of lymphatics giving way to the tumor cells to metastasis to other lymph nodes (commonly the lymph nodes of neck) and cause lymphadenopathy. The cervical lyphydenopathy can be ipsilateral (70% or more patients) or bilateral (30% and fewer patients). The carcinoma of tonsil usually spreads through the cervical lymph node levels II, III, IV, V, and retropharyngeal lymph nodes.

The fourth edition of WHO' s classification of head and neck tumors subdivides squamous cell carcinoma of the tonsil into two types: HPV positive or negative. HPV positive tumors arise from the deep lymphoid tissue of the tonsillar crypts and are non-keratinizing. On the other hand HPV negative tumors develop from the tonsillar surface epithelium and hence have keratinizing dysplasia.

=== Routes of metastasis ===
Metastasis is common in tonsillar carcinoma. It largely depends on the stage of the cancer and the route through with the cancer cells metastasize. The cancer cells may spread to adjacent structures, to lymphatics or to distant locations in the body producing secondary tumors.

==== Local ====
The tumor may spread locally to soft palate and pillars, base of tongue, pharyngeal wall and hypopharynx. It may invade pterygoid muscles and mandible, resulting in pain and trismus. Parapharyngeal space may also get invaded.

==== Lymphatic ====
50% of patients have initial cervical node involvement at the time of presentation. Jugulodigastric lymph nodes are the first to be involved.

==== Distant metastasis ====
The occurrence of distant metastasis varies extensively, ranging between 4–31% in clinical studies. Factors influencing the incidence of distant metastasis are:

- Location of primary tumor
- Initial staging
- Histological differentiation
- Loco-regional control of the primary tumor

The records of 471 male patients with tonsillar carcinoma seen at the Veterans Administration Medical Center, Hines, Illinois, have been reviewed to establish the incidence and site of distant metastasis. All the patients were histological diagnosed and proven cases of tonsillar carcinoma. 72 (15%) out of 471 patients and 33 (29%) of 155 autopsied patients were reported to have distant metastasis.

Squamous cell carcinoma was the most common reported cell type (88%); cases with lymphoepithelioma had the highest incidence of distant metastasis. The most common anatomical sites of incidence of distant metastasis include lung, liver and bones. Thorough investigation of these organs is highly recommended before treatment as well as during follow-ups.

== Diagnosis ==
The first step to diagnosing tonsil carcinoma is to obtain an accurate history from the patient. The physician will also examine the patient for any indicative physical signs. A few tests then, maybe conducted depending on the progress of the disease or if the doctor feels the need for. The tests include: Fine needle aspiration, blood tests, MRI, x-rays and PET scan.

=== Staging ===
The staging of a tumor mass is based on TNM staging.

T staging is the based on the tumor mass. The N staging is based on the extent of spread of cancer to the lymph nodes. Finally, the M stage indicates if the cancer has spread beyond the head and neck or not.

==== T Staging ====
The basis of deciding the T stage depends on physical examination and imaging of the tumor.

T Stage	Tumor Dimension
Tx	Primary tumor cannot be assessed
T0	Primary tumor cannot be located
Tis	Carcinoma in situ
T1	≤ 2 cm in dimension
T2	> 2 cm but ≤ 4 cm in dimension
T3	> 4 cm and has grown till the epiglottis
T4a	Moderately advanced, tumor has grown into larynx, beyond muscles of tongue, hard palate, lower jawbone and/or medial pterygoid muscles
T4b	Extremely advanced, invasion of lateral pterygoid muscle, pterygoid plates, nasopharynx, into skull base or is encasing the carotid artery.

==== N staging ====
This stage is decided through the assessment of the lymph nodes.

N Stage	Lymph node dimension
Nx	No assessment of neck lymph nodes
N0	No evidence of spread
N1	Ipsilateral, Single lymph node, ≤ 3 cm in size
N2a	cancer cells have metastasised to a single lymph node, ipsilateral to main tumor, > 3 cm but ≤ 6 cm in size
N2b	Cancer cells have metastasised to multiple lymph nodes, ipsilateral to mail tumor, > 6 cm in size
N2c	Detection of lymph nodes in the neck, contralateral or bilateral to the main tumor, >6 cm in size
N3	Metastasis of cancer cells to one or more lymph nodes, >6 cm in size

==== M staging ====
Based on the examination of the entire body.

M Stage	Metastasis beyond Head and neck
M0	No evidence
M1	Evidence of metastasis to structures outside head and neck present, commonly involved organs are: Lungs, bones, brain

Finally, the stage is decided by concluding the above results and referring the following chart:

Stage	T Stage	N Stage	M Stage
Stage I	T1	N0	M0
Stage II	T2	N0	M0
Stage III	T3	N0	M0
	T1	N1	M0
	T2	N1	M0
	T3	N1	M0
Stage IVA	T4a	N0	M0
	T4a	N1	M0
	T1	N2	M0
	T2	N2	M0
	T3	N2	M0
	T4a	N2	M0
Stage IVB	T4b	Any N	M0
	Any T	N3	M0
Stage IVC	Any T	Any N	M1

== Treatment ==
The treatment for tonsil carcinoma includes the following methods:

=== Radiotherapy ===
Early radio-sensitive tumors are treated by radiotherapy along with irradiation of cervical nodes. The radiation uses high-energy X-rays, electron beams, or radioactive isotopes to destroy cancer cells.

=== Chemotherapy ===
Induction chemotherapy is the treatment adapted for shrinking the tonsil tumor. It is given prior to other treatments, hence, the term induction. After the therapy is completed, the patient is asked to rest and is evaluated over a period of time. Then the patient is given chemo-radiation therapy (a combination of chemotherapy and radiation) to completely destroy the tumor cells.

=== Surgery ===
If radiation and chemotherapy are unable to destroy the tumor, surgical intervention is considered. Excision of the tonsil can be done for early superficial lesions. Large lesions and those which invade bone require wide surgical excision with hemimandibulectomy and neck dissection (Commando operation)

=== Combination therapy ===
Surgery may be combined with pre- or post operative radiation. Chemotherapy may be given as an adjunct to surgery or radiation.

== Prognosis ==
Prognosis is determined by various factors such as stage, Human Papilloma Virus (HPV) status, Lymph infiltration of cancer cells, spread of cancer cells beyond the lymph node capsule, margins of the tumor and the extent of metastasis. Many factors are unique to each individual patient and may affect the chances of success of the treatment.

Factors determining the prognosis of tonsillar carcinoma are as follows:

=== HPV status ===
Tonsillar carcinoma can be either HPV related or HPV unrelated. It is shown that cases which are HPV positive have a better prognosis than those with HPV negative oropharyngeal cancer.

=== Stage ===
The stage at which the cancer presents itself affects the type of definitive treatment, chance of cure, recurrence of cancer and survival rate of the patient. Generally the patient presents very late due to the lack of definitive symptoms in the early stages of the disease. Nearly three fourths of the patients present in Stage III or later.

The stages of oropharyngeal cancer are as follows:

- Stage 0 (carcinoma in situ): This stage indicates a good prognosis as most patients with stage 0 survive for a long period without the requirement of an intensive treatment. Although, the patient must cease smoking as it can increase the risk of developing a new cancer.
- Stage I and II: Most patients presenting at this stage receive successful treatment, showing a good prognosis. The modes of treatment for this stage include chemotherapy, surgery, radiation therapy or chemoradiation. The main treatment at this stage is radiation, targeting the tumor and the cervical lymph nodes. Surgical removal of the tumor and lymphadenectomy of the cervical (neck) lymph nodes can also be taken up at the main treatment method instead of radiation. Remaining cancer cells post surgery are treated with chemoradiation.
- Stage III and IVA: In this stage the cancer cells metastasize into the local tissues and cervical lymph nodes. The treatment used in these cases is chemo radiation. Any remaining cancer cells post chemoradiation are surgically removed. Lymphadenectomy may also be done after treatment with chemoradiation if the cancer cells have infiltrated the cervical lymph nodes. Another method of treatment includes, first, surgical removal of tumor as well as cervical lymph nodes followed by chemoradiation or radiation to decrease the chances of recurrence.
- Stage IVB: In this stage the cancer has already undergone distant metastasis, hence showing poor prognosis. The treatment includes chemotherapy, cetuximab or both. Radiation may be used to aid in relieving symptoms arising from the cancer and also to prevent further development of complications.

=== Lymphatic infiltration ===
Nearly half of the patients with anterior pillar lesions and three fourths of the patients with tonsillar fossa lesions have nodal metastasis at the time of presentation itself. Metastasis of cancer cells to cervical lymph nodes diminishes the chance of cure. Specially, if there is evidence of metastasis of cancer cells beyond the lymph node capsule. Though, some data indicates that the metastasis of cancer cells outside the lymph node capsule is a bad prognosis for HPV-unrelated oropharynx cancer than it is for HPV-related oropharynx.

=== Tumor extension ===
Extension of the tumor to the base of tongue reduces the chances of cure drastically. It also increases the chances of recurrence after treatment.

=== Metastasis ===
Spread of cancer cells to local structures like tissues, vessels, large nerves and lymphatics worsens a patient's prognosis.

A study that analyzed the survival rate in HPV-related oropharynx carcinoma to that in HPV-unrelated oropharynx carcinoma. The study revealed that based on the HPV status of the patient, for STAGE III and STAGE IV oropharynx carcinoma, there was a discrepancy in survival after three years. The survival was 82% in HPV positive and then also 57% in HPV negative cancers.
