= Primary tumor =

Stage of a cancerous tumor

A primary tumor is a tumor growing at the anatomical site where tumor progression began and proceeded to yield a cancerous mass. Most solid cancers develop at their primary site but may then go on to metastasize or spread to other parts of the body. These further tumors are secondary tumors.

Most cancers continue to be called after their primary site, as in breast cancer or lung cancer for example, even after they have spread to other parts of the body. Cancer of unknown primary origin is cancer that is determined to be at the metastatic stage, but a primary tumor cannot be identified.
