= List of drugs granted breakthrough therapy designation =

Drugs granted breakthrough therapy designation (BTD) by the US Food and Drug Administration (FDA). Drugs may be listed more than once since breakthrough therapy can be awarded for multiple indications.

== 2025 ==
Drug	Manufacturer	Indication
Aficamten		The treatment of adults with symptomatic obstructive hypertrophic cardiomyopathy (oHCM) to improve functional capacity and symptoms
Avutometinib		The treatment of adult patients with KRAS-mutated recurrent low-grade serous ovarian cancer (LGSOC) who have received prior systemic therapy
Brensocatib		The treatment of non-cystic fibrosis bronchiectasis (NCFB) in adult and pediatric patients 12 years of age and older
Datopotamab deruxtecan		The treatment of adult patients with locally advanced or metastatic epidermal growth factor receptor (EGFR) mutated non -small cell lung cancer (NSCLC) who have received prior EGFR- directed therapy and platinum- based therapy
Diazoxide choline		The treatment of hyperphagia in adults and pediatric patients 4 years of age and older with Prader-Willi syndrome
Doxecitine/doxribtimine		Treatment of thymidine kinase 2 deficiency (TK2d) in adults and pediatric patients with an age of symptom onset on or before 12 years
Durvalumab		In combination with fluorouracil, leucovorin, oxaliplatin and docetaxel (FLOT) as neoadjuvant and adjuvant treatment, followed by single-agent IMFINZI, is indicated for the treatment of adult patients with resectable gastric or gastroesophageal junction adenocarcinoma (GC/GEJC)
Epcoritamab		In combination with lenalidomide and rituximab for the treatment of adult patients with relapsed or refractory follicular lymphoma (FL)
Esketamine		For treatment-resistant depression (TRD) in adults, as monotherapy or in conjunction with an oral antidepressant
Evinacumab		As an adjunct to diet and exercise and other low-density lipoprotein-cholesterol (LDL-C) lowering therapies to reduce LDL-C in adults and pediatric patients, aged 1 year and older, with homozygous familial hypercholesterolemia (HoFH)
Trastuzumab deruxtecan		The treatment of adult patients with unresectable or metastatic hormone receptor (HR)-positive, HER2-low (IHC 1+ or IHC 2+/ISH-) or HER2-ultralow (IHC 0 with membrane staining) breast cancer, as determined by an FDA-approved test, that has progressed on one or more endocrine therapies in the metastatic setting
Trastuzumab deruxtecan		In combination with pertuzumab for the first-line treatment of adult patients with unresectable or metastatic HER2-positive (IHC 3+ or ISH+) breast cancer as determined by an FDA-approved test
Gemcitabine-Releasing Intravesical System		Treatment of adult patients with Bacillus Calmette-Guérin (BCG)-unresponsive, non-muscle invasive bladder cancer (HR-NMIBC) with carcinoma in situ (CIS) with or without papillary tumors
Glecaprevir/pibrentasvir		The treatment of acute hepatitis C virus (HCV) infection in adults and pediatric patients ages 3 to less than 18 years of age
Inebilizumab		For use of in adult patients with immunoglobulin G4- Related Disease (IgG4-RD)
Ipilimumab		In combination with nivolumab, is indicated for the treatment of adult and pediatric patients 12 years and older with unresectable or metastatic microsatellite instability-high (MSI-H) or mismatch repair deficient (dMMR) colorectal cancer (CRC)
Iptacopan		The treatment of adults with complement 3 glomerulopathy (C3G), to reduce proteinuria
Lenacapavir		Pre-exposure prophylaxis (PrEP) to reduce the risk of sexually acquired HIV-1 in adults and adolescents weighing at least 35 kg who are at risk for HIV-1 acquisition
Narsoplimab		Treatment of adult and pediatric patients two years of age and older with hematopoietic stem cell transplant-associated thrombotic microangiopathy (TA-TMA)
Nerandomilast		The treatment of idiopathic pulmonary fibrosis in adult patients
Nerandomilast		The treatment of progressive pulmonary fibrosis in adult patients
Nivolumab		In combination with ipilimumab, is indicated for the treatment of adult and pediatric patients 12 years and older with unresectable or metastatic microsatellite instability-high (MSI-H) or mismatch repair deficient (dMMR) colorectal cancer (CRC)
Obinutuzumab		Treatment of adult patients with active lupus nephritis (LN) who are receiving standard therapy A short duration infusion of approximately 90 minutes from the second infusion onwards in patients with active lupus nephritis (LN) who have completed the first obinutuzumab administration at the standard infusion rate without experiencing any Grade = 3 infusion-related reactions (IRRs)
Penpulimab		Penpulimab-kcqx is indicated: • In combination with either cisplatin or carboplatin and gemcitabine, for the firstline treatment of adults with recurrent or metastatic non-keratinizing nasopharyngeal carcinoma (NPC) • As a single agent, for the treatment of adults with metastatic non-keratinizing NPC with disease progression on or after platinum-based chemotherapy and at least one other prior line of therapy
Plozasiran		As an adjunct to diet to reduce triglycerides in adults with familial chylomicronemia syndrome (FCS)
Semaglutide		For the treatment of noncirrhotic metabolic dysfunction-associated steatohepatitis (MASH), formerly known as nonalcoholic steatohepatitis (NASH), with moderate to advanced liver fibrosis (consistent with stages F2 to F3 fibrosis) in adults
Sevabertinib		Treatment of adult patients with locally advanced or metastatic non-squamous, non-small cell lung cancer (NSCLC) whose tumors have activating HER2 (ERBB2) tyrosine kinase domain activating mutations, as detected by an FDA-approved test, and who have received a prior systemic therapy
Sibeprenlimab		To reduce proteinuria in adults with primary immunoglobulin A nephropathy (IgAN) at risk for disease progression
Sotorasib		In combination with panitumumab, for the treatment of adult patients with KRAS G12C-mutated metastatic colorectal cancer as determined by an FDA approved test, who have received prior fluoropyrimidine-, oxaliplatin-, and irinotecan-based chemotherapy
Sunvozertinib		The treatment of adult patients with locally advanced or metastatic non-small cell lung cancer (NSCLC) with epidermal growth factor receptor (EGFR) exon 20 insertion mutations, as detected by an FDA-approved test, whose disease has progressed on or after platinum-based chemotherapy
Suzetrigine		The treatment of moderate to severe acute pain in adults
Taletrectinib		The treatment of adult patients with locally advanced or metastatic ROS1-positive non-small cell lung cancer (NSCLC)
Telisotuzumab vedotin		The treatment of adult patients with locally advanced or metastatic, non-squamous non-small cell lung cancer (NSCLC) with high c-Met protein overexpression [>=50% of tumor cells with strong (3+) staining], as determined by an FDA-approved test, who have received a prior systemic therapy
Ziftomenib		Treatment of adult patients with relapsed or refractory acute myeloid leukemia (AML) with a susceptible nucleophosmin 1 (NPM1) mutation who have no satisfactory alternative treatment options
Zongertinib		Treatment of adult patients with unresectable or metastatic non-squamous non-small cell lung cancer (NSCLC) whose tumors have HER2 (ERBB2) tyrosine kinase domain activating mutations, as detected by an FDA-approved test, and who have received prior systemic therapy

== 2024 ==
Drug	Manufacturer	Indication
Adagrasib		In combination with cetuximab for the treatment of adults with KRAS G12C mutated locally advanced or metastatic colorectal cancer who have been previously treated with fluoropyrimidine-, oxaliplatin-, and irinotecan-based chemotherapy
Arimoclomol		In combination with miglustat for the treatment of neurological manifestations of Niemann-Pick disease type C (NPC) in people aged two years of age and older
Asciminib	Novartis	Treatment of adults with newly diagnosed Philadelphia chromosomepositive chronic myeloid leukemia (Ph+ CML) in chronic phase (CP)
Blinatumomab		Treatment of CD19-positive Philadelphia chromosome-negative B-cell precursor acute lymphoblastic leukemia (ALL) in the consolidation phase of multiphase chemotherapy in people aged one month of age and older
Budesonide		For twelve weeks of treatment in people aged eleven years of age and older with eosinophilic esophagitis
Ciltacabtagene autoleucel	Janssen Biotech	Treatment of adults with relapsed or refractory multiple myeloma, who previously received a proteasome inhibitor (PI), an immunomodulatory agent (IMiD) and an anti-CD38 antibody
Crinecerfont (capsules)	Neurocrine Biosciences	Adjunctive treatment to glucocorticoid replacement to control androgens in people aged four years of age and older with classic congenital adrenal hyperplasia (CAH)
Crinecerfont (solution)	Neurocrine Biosciences	Adjunctive treatment to glucocorticoid replacement to control androgens in people aged four years of age and older with classic congenital adrenal hyperplasia (CAH)
Danicopan		As add-on therapy to ravulizumab or eculizumab for the treatment of extravascular hemolysis (EVH) in adults with paroxysmal nocturnal hemoglobinuria (PNH)
Donanemab		Treatment of Alzheimer’s disease
Dupilumab	Regeneron	As an add-on maintenance treatment in adults with inadequately controlled chronic obstructive pulmonary disease (COPD) and an eosinophilic phenotype
Durvalumab	Astrazeneca	Treatment of adults with limited stage small cell lung cancer (LS-SCLC) whose disease has not progressed following concurrent platinum-based chemotherapy and radiation therapy (cCRT)
Elafibranor		Treatment of primary biliary cholangitis (PBC) in combination with ursodeoxycholic acid (UDCA) in adults who have an inadequate response to UDCA, or as monotherapy in people unable to tolerate UDCA
Epkinly		Treatment of adults with relapsed or refractory follicular lymphoma (FL) after two or more lines of systemic therapy
Fidanacogene elaparvovec	Pfizer	Treatment of adults with moderate to severe hemophilia B (congenital factor IX deficiency) who are receiving routine prophylaxis and without pre-existing neutralizing antibodies to adeno-associated virus serotype Rh74var (AAVRh74var) capsid detected by an FDA-approved test.
Inavolisib	Genentech	In combination with palbociclib and fulvestrant for the treatment of adults with endocrine-resistant, PIK3CA-mutated, hormone receptor (HR)-positive, human epidermal growth-factor receptor 2 (HER2)-negative, locally advanced or metastatic breast cancer, as detected by an FDA-approved test, following recurrence on or after completing adjuvant endocrine therapy
Nemolizumab		Treatment of adults with Prurigo Nodularis
Nogapendekin alfa inbakicept		Indicated with Bacillus Calmette-Guérin (BCG) for the treatment of adults with BCG-unresponsive nonmuscle invasive bladder cancer (NMIBC) with carcinoma in situ (CIS) with or without papillary tumors
Olezarsen	Ionis Pharmaceuticals	Adjunct to diet to reduce triglycerides in adults with familial chylomicronemia syndrome (FCS)
Omalizumab		Treatment of IgE-mediated food allergy in people aged one year of age and older for the reduction of allergic reactions (Type I), including anaphylaxis, that may occur with accidental exposure to one or more foods. To be used in conjunction with food allergen avoidance
Osimertinib		In combination with pemetrexed and platinum-based chemotherapy for the first-line treatment of adults with locally advanced or metastatic non-small cell lung cancer whose tumors have EGFR exon 19 deletions or exon 21 L858R mutations, as detected by an FDA-approved test
Osimertinib		Treatment of adults with locally advanced, unresectable (stage III) non-small cell lung cancer (NSCLC) whose disease has not progressed during or following concurrent or sequential platinum-based chemoradiation therapy and whose tumors have EGFR exon 19 deletions or exon 21 L858R mutations, as detected by an FDA-approved test
Repotrectinib		Treatment of people aged twelve years of age and older with solid tumors that: have a neurotrophic tyrosine receptor kinase (NTRK) gene fusion, are locally advanced or metastatic or where surgical resection is likely to result in severe morbidity, and have progressed following treatment or have no satisfactory alternative therapy
Resmetirom		In conjunction with diet and exercise, for the treatment of adults with noncirrhotic nonalcoholic steatohepatitis (NASH) with moderate to advanced liver fibrosis (consistent with stages F2 to F3 fibrosis)
Revumenib		Treatment of relapsed or refractory acute leukemia with a lysine methyltransferase 2A gene (KMT2A) translocation in people aged one year of age and older
Seladelpar		Treatment of primary biliary cholangitis (PBC) in combination with ursodeoxycholic acid (UDCA) in adults who have an inadequate response to UDCA, or as monotherapy in people unable to tolerate UDCA
Sotatercept		Treatment of adults with pulmonary arterial hypertension (PAH, World Health Organization [WHO] Group 1) to increase exercise capacity, improve WHO functional class (FC), and reduce the risk of clinical worsening events
Spesolimab		Treatment of generalized pustular psoriasis (GPP) in people aged twelve years of age and older and weighing at least 40 kg
Tarlatamab		Treatment of adults with extensive stage small cell lung cancer (ES-SCLC) with disease progression on or after platinum-based chemotherapy
Tirzepatide	Eli Lilly	Treatment of moderate to severe obstructive sleep apnea (OSA) in adults with obesity
Tovorafenib		Treatment of people aged six months of age and older with relapsed or refractory pediatric low-grade glioma (LGG) harboring a BRAF fusion or rearrangement, or BRAF V600 mutation
Trastuzumab deruxtecan		Treatment of adults with unresectable or metastatic HER2-positive (IHC 3+) solid tumors who have received prior systemic treatment and have no satisfactory alternative treatment options
Vorasidenib		Treatment of people aged twelve years of age and older with grade 2 astrocytoma or oligodendroglioma with a susceptible IDH1 or IDH2 mutation, following surgery including biopsy, subtotal resection, or gross total resection
Zanidatamab	Jazz Pharmaceuticals	Treatment of adults with previously treated, unresectable or metastatic HER2-positive (IHC3+) biliary tract cancer as detected by an FDA approved test
Zenocutuzumab		Treatment of adults with advanced, unresectable or metastatic non-small cell lung cancer harboring a neuregulin 1 (NRG1) gene fusion with disease progression on or after prior systemic therapy; and adults with advanced, unresectable or metastatic pancreatic adenocarcinoma harboring an NRG1 gene fusion with disease progression on or after prior systemic therapy

== 2023 ==
Drug	Manufacturer	Indication
Avacincaptad pegol		To treat geographic atrophy secondary to age-related macular degeneration
Cipaglucosidase alfa		To treat late-onset Pompe disease with miglustat
Dabrafenib		
Dostarlimab		
Eflornithine		
Elranatamab		To treat relapsed or refractory multiple myeloma after at least four lines of therapy
Enfortumab vedotin		
Iptacopan		To treat paroxysmal nocturnal hemoglobinuria
Ivosidenib		
Lecanemab		To treat Alzheimer's disease
Miglustat		
Nedosiran		To lower urinary oxalate levels in primary hyperoxaluria type 1 and relatively preserved kidney function
Nirogacestat		To treat desmoid tumors
Pembrolizumab		
Sutimlimab		
Talquetamab		To treat relapsed or refractory multiple myeloma after at least four therapies
Toripalimab		To treat recurrent or metastatic nasopharyngeal carcinoma with or following other therapies
Tucatinib		

== 2022 ==
Drug	Manufacturer	Indication
Abrocitinib	Pfizer	atopic dermatitis
Tebentafusp	Immunocore	HLA-A*02:01–positive uveal melanoma
Sutimlimab	Bioverativ	cold agglutinin disease
Lutetium (177Lu) vipivotide tetraxetan	Novartis	prostate-specific membrane antigen (PSMA)-positive metastatic castration-resistant prostate cancer (mCRPC)
Alpelisib	Novartis	PIK3CA-related overgrowth spectrum conditions
Mavacamten	Myokardia Inc	class II-III obstructive hypertrophic cardiomyopathy
Trastuzumab deruxtecan	Daiichi Sankyo	granted for three indications: HER2-positive breast cancer with prior anti-HER2-based treatment; HER2 low (IHC 1+ or IHC 2+/ISH) breast cancer; and non-small cell-lung cancer with an activating HER2 mutation
Dupilumab	Regeneron Pharmaceuticals	granted for two indications: eosinophilic esophagitis; and atopic dermatitis
Ivosidenib	Servier Pharmaceuticals	acute myeloid leukemia with a susceptible IDH1 mutation
Baricitinib	Eli Lilly and Company	severe alopecia areata
Setmelanotide	Rhythm Pharmaceuticals	Bardet–Biedl syndrome
Dextromethorphan/bupropion	Axsome Therapeutics	major depressive disorder
Pemigatinib	Incyte	myeloid/lymphoid neoplasms with FGFR1 rearrangement
Olipudase alfa	Genzyme	non–central nervous system manifestations of acid sphingomyelinase deficiency
Spesolimab	Boehringer Ingelheim	generalized pustular psoriasis
Futibatinib	Taiho Oncology	intrahepatic cholangiocarcinoma with FGFR2 gene fusions or other rearrangements
Teclistamab	Janssen	multiple myeloma
Teplizumab	Provention Bio	delay the onset of stage 3 type 1 diabetes (T1D) in stage 2 T1D
Atezolizumab	Genentech	alveolar soft part sarcoma
Adagrasib	Mirati Therapeutics	KRAS G12C-mutated non-small cell lung cancer
Mosunetuzumab	Genentech	follicular lymphoma
Lenacapavir	Gilead Sciences	HIV-1

== 2021 ==
Drug	Manufacturer	Indication
Crizotinib	PF Prism	ALK-positive systemic anaplastic large cell lymphoma
Trastuzumab deruxtecan	Daiichi Sankyo	HER2-positive gastric or gastroesophageal junction adenocarcinoma, previously treated with trastuzumab
Umbralisib	TG Therapeutics	marginal zone lymphoma, previously treated with an anti-CD20-based regimen
Evinacumab	Regeneron Pharmaceuticals	homozygous familial hypercholesterolemia
Trilaciclib	G1 Therapeutics	myelosuppression, when administered prior to a platinum/etoposide or topotecan containing regimen for small cell lung cancer
Fosdenopterin	Origin Biosciences	molybdenum cofactor deficiency, Type A
TocilizumInsmed Incab	Genentech	systemic sclerosis-associated interstitial lung disease
Rilonacept	Kiniksa Pharmaceuticals	recurrent pericarditis
Dostarlimab	GSK	mismatch repair deficient recurrent or advanced endometrial cancer
Dapagliflozin	AstraZeneca	chronic kidney disease
Bupivacaine/meloxicam	Heron Therapeutics	postsurgical analgesia
Amivantamab	Janssen Biotech	non-small cell lung cancer with EGFR exon 20 insertion mutations
Sotorasib	Amgen	non-small cell lung cancer with KRAS G12C mutation
Avapritinib	Blueprint Medicines Corp	granted for two indications: mast cell leukemia and advanced systemic mastocytosis
Belumosudil	Kadmon Pharmaceuticals	chronic graft-versus-host disease
Pembrolizumab	Merck	high risk, early-stage triple-negative breast cancer
Avalglucosidase alfa	Genzyme	late-onset Pompe disease
Lenvatinib	Eisai Inc	advanced renal cell carcinoma, used in combination with pembrolizumab
Difelikefalin	Cara Therapeutics	pruritis related to hemodialysis in chronic kidney disease
Mobocertinib	Takeda Pharmaceuticals	non-small cell lung cancer with EGFR exon 20 insertion mutations
Cabozantinib	Exelixis	thyroid cancer
Maralixibat	Mirum Pharmaceuticals	cholestatic pruritus in Alagille syndrome
Asciminib	Novartis	granted for two indications: Philadelphia chromosome-positive chronic myeloid leukemia previously treated with tyrosine kinase inhibitors, and Philadelphia chromosome-positive chronic myeloid leukemia with T315I mutation
Sirolimus	AADI Bioscience	metastatic or unresectable perivascular epithelioid cell tumor
Maribavir	Takeda	refractory post-transplant cytomegalovirus infection
Abatacept	Bristol Myers Squibb	acute graft-versus-host disease, in combination with a calcineurin inhibitor and methotrexate, undergoing hematopoietic stem cell transplantation from a matched or 1 allele-mismatched unrelated donor
Voxelotor	Global Blood Therapeutics Inc	sickle cell disease
Cabotegravir	ViiV Healthcare Co	pre-exposure prophylaxis for HIV

== 2020 ==
Drug	Manufacturer	Indication
Avapritinib	Blueprint Medicines Corp	metastatic gastrointestinal stromal tumor
Teprotumumab	Horizon Therapeutics	thyroid eye disease
Nintedanib	Boehringer Ingelheim	chronic fibrosing interstitial lung diseases
Ipilimumab	Bristol-Myers Squibb	hepatocellular carcinoma
Nivolumab	Bristol-Myers Squibb	hepatocellular carcinoma
Selumetinib	AstraZeneca	neurofibromatosis type 1
Mitomycin	Urogen Pharma	upper tract urothelial cancer
Tucatinib	Seattle Genetics	advanced unresectable or metastatic HER2-positive breast cancer
Pemigatinib	Incyte Corp	metastatic cholangiocarcinoma with FGFR2 fusion
Sacituzumab govitecan	Immunomedics	metastatic triple-negative breast cancer
Capmatinib	Novartis	metastatic non-small cell lung cancer
Selpercatinib	Loxo Oncology	metastatic RET fusion-positive non-small cell lung cancer
Pomalidomide	Celgene Corp	AIDS-related Kaposi sarcoma
Rucaparib	Clovis Oncology	metastatic castration-resistant prostate cancer
Ripretinib	Deciphera Pharmaceuticals	advanced gastrointestinal stromal tumor
Artesunate	Amivas LLC	severe malaria
Bevacizumab	Genentech	metastatic hepatocellular carcinoma
Atezolizumab	Genentech	metastatic hepatocellular carcinoma
Inebilizumab	Viela Bio	neuromyelitis optica spectrum disorder
Fostemsavir	Viiv Healthcare	multidrug-resistant HIV-1
Tafasitamab	MorphoSys	relapsed or refractory diffuse large B-cell lymphoma
Esketamine	Janssen	major depressive disorder with acute suicidal ideation or behavior
belantamab mafodotin	GlaxoSmithKline	refractory multiple myeloma
Satralizumab	Genentech	neuromyelitis optica spectrum disorder
Pralsetinib	Blueprint Medicines Corp	RET fusion-positive non-small cell lung cancer
Pitolisant	Harmony Biosciences	cataplexy in adults with narcolepsy
Atoltivimab/maftivimab/odesivimab	Regeneron	Ebola Zaire
Lonafarnib	Eiger BioPharmaceuticals	Hutchinson-Gilford progeria syndrome (HGPS), processing-deficient progeroid laminopathies with LMNA or ZMPSTE24 mutations
Lumasiran	Alnylam Pharmaceuticals	primary hyperoxaluria type 1
Naxitamab	Y-mAbs Therapeutics	relapsed or refractory high-risk neuroblastoma, used in combination with GM-CSF
Setmelanotide	Rhythm Pharmaceuticals	medical obesity caused by proopiomelanocortin (POMC), proprotein convertase subtilisin/kexin type 1 (PCSK1), or leptin receptor (LEPR) deficiency
Pralsetinib	Blueprint Medicines Corp	RET-mutant medullary thyroid cancer or advanced or metastatic RET fusion-positive thyroid cancer, in radioactive iodine-refractory patients
Belimumab	GlaxoSmithKline	active lupus nephritis
Osimertinib	AstraZeneca	adjuvant therapy after tumor resection in non-small cell lung cancer with EGFR exon 19 deletions or exon 21 L858R mutations
Ansuvimab	Ridgeback Biotherapeutics	Ebola Zaire

== 2019 ==
Drug	Manufacturer	Indication
Letrozole/ribociclib	Novartis Pharmaceuticals	HR-positive, HER2-negative advanced or metastatic breast cancer
Esketamine	Janssen	treatment-resistant depression
Dupilumab	Regeneron Pharmaceuticals	atopic dermatitis
Brexanolone	Sage Therapeutics	postpartum depression
Palbociclib	Pfizer	metastatic breast cancer
Erdafitinib	Janssen	urothelial carcinoma
Pembrolizumab	Merck Sharp & Dohme	advanced renal cell carcinoma
Ado-trastuzumab emtansine	Genentech	HER2-positive early breast cancer
Tafamidis meglumine	Foldrx Pharmaceuticals	cardiomyopathy
Avelumab	EMD Serono	advanced renal cell carcinoma
Venetoclax	AbbVie	chronic lymphocytic leukemiaor small lymphocytic lymphoma
Galcanezumab	Eli Lilly	episodic cluster headache
Polatuzumab vedotin	Genentech	diffuse large B-cell lymphoma
Pexidartinib	Daiichi Sankyo	tenosynovial giant cell tumor
Entrectinib	Genentech	solid tumors that have a neurotrophic tyrosine receptor kinase (NTRK) gene fusion
Pembrolizumab	Merck	endometrial carcinoma
Lenvatinib	Eisai	endometrial carcinoma
Elexacaftor/tezacaftor/ivacaftor	Vertex Pharmaceuticals	cystic fibrosis
Zanubrutinib	BeiGene	mantle cell lymphoma
Crizanlizumab	Novartis	sickle cell disease
Givosiran	Alnylam Pharmaceuticals	acute hepatic porphyria
Acalabrutinib	AstraZeneca	relapsed or refractory chronic lymphocytic leukemia
Acalabrutinib	AstraZeneca	untreated chronic lymphocytic leukemia
Voxelotor	Global Blood Therapeutics	sickle cell disease
Enfortumab vedotin	Astellas Pharma	metastatic urothelial carcinoma
Fam-trastuzumab deruxtecan	Daiichi Sankyo	HER2-positive breast cancer

== 2018 ==
Drug	Manufacturer	Indication
Tezacaftor/ivacaftor	Vertex Pharmaceuticals	cystic fibrosis
Durvalumab	AstraZeneca UK	unresectable Stage III non-small cell lung cancer
Ibalizumab	Theratechnologies	human immunodeficiency virus type 1 (HIV-1) infection
Brentuximab vedotin	Seattle Genetics	Hodgkin lymphoma
Ipilimumab	Bristol-Myers Squibb	renal cell carcinoma
Nivolumab	Bristol-Myers Squibb	renal cell carcinoma
Burosumab	Kyowa Hakko Kirin	X-linked hypophosphatemia
Osimertinib	AstraZeneca	metastatic non-small cell lung cancer
Dabrafenib	Novartis Pharmaceuticals	melanoma with BRAF V600E or V600K mutations
Trametinib	Novartis Pharmaceuticals	melanoma with BRAF V600E or V600K mutations
Dabrafenib	Novartis Pharmaceuticals	anaplastic thyroid cancer with BRAF V600E mutation
Trametinib	Novartis Pharmaceuticals	anaplastic thyroid cancer with BRAF V600E mutation
Fingolimod	Novartis Pharmaceuticals	multiple sclerosis
Rituximab	Genentech	pemphigus vulgaris
Venetoclax	AbbVie	chronic lymphocytic leukemia
Pembrolizumab	Merck Sharp & Dohme	mediastinal large B-cell lymphoma
Ipilimumab	Bristol-Myers Squibb	metastatic colorectal cancer
Nivolumab	Bristol-Myers Squibb	metastatic colorectal cancer
Ribociclib	Novartis Pharmaceuticals	breast cancer
Tafenoquine	GlaxoSmithKline	Plasmodium vivax malaria
Iobenguane I 131	Progenics Pharmaceuticals	pheochromocytoma or paraganglioma
Lumacaftor/ivacaftor	Vertex Pharmaceuticals	cystic fibrosis
Mogamulizumab	Kyowa Hakko Kirin	mycosis fungoides or Sézary syndrome
Patisiran	Alnylam Pharmaceuticals	hereditary transthyretin-mediated amyloidosis
Cenegermin	Dompe Farmaceutici	neurotrophic keratitis
Lanadelumab	Takeda Pharmaceuticals	hereditary angioedema
Cemiplimab	Regeneron Pharmaceuticals	cutaneous squamous cell carcinoma
Amikacin liposome inhalation suspension	Insmed	mycobacterial lung disease
Emicizumab	Genentech	hemophilia
Lorlatinib	Pfizer	ALK-positive, metastatic non-small cell lung cancer
Brentuximab vedotin	Seattle Genetics	anaplastic large-cell lymphoma
Eltrombopag	Novartis Pharmaceuticals	severe aplastic anemia
Emapalumab	Swedish Orphan Biovitrum	hemophagocytic lymphohistiocytosis
Venetoclax	AbbVie	acute myeloid leukemia
Larotrectinib	Bayer Healthcare	solid tumors that have a neurotrophic receptor tyrosine kinase (NTRK) gene fusion
Larotrectinib	Bayer Healthcare	solid tumors that have a neurotrophic receptor tyrosine kinase (NTRK) gene fusion
Amifampridine	Catalyst Pharmaceuticals	Lambert-Eaton myasthenic syndrome
Pembrolizumab	Merck Sharp & Dohme	Merkel cell carcinoma
Tagraxofusp	Stemline Therapeutics	blastic plasmacytoid dendritic cell neoplasm
Balovaptan	Roche	Autism spectrum

== 2017 ==
Drug	Manufacturer	Indication
Nivolumab	Bristol-Myers Squibb	urothelial carcinoma
Ribociclib	Novartis Pharmaceuticals	HR-positive, HER2-negative breast cancer
Pembrolizumab	Merck Sharp & Dohme	Hodgkin lymphoma
Avelumab	EMD Serono	metastatic Merkel cell carcinoma
Niraparib	GlaxoSmithKline	recurrent ovarian cancer responsive to platinum-based chemotherapy
Ocrelizumab	Genentech	multiple sclerosis
Dupilumab	Regeneron Pharmaceuticals	atopic dermatitis
Palbociclib	Pfizer	HR-positive, HER2-negative breast cancer
Valbenazine	Neurocrine Biosciences	tardive dyskinesia
Ranibizumab	Genentech	diabetic retinopathy
Cerliponase alfa	BioMarin Pharmaceutical	tripeptidyl peptidase 1 (TPP1) deficiency
Midostaurin	Novartis Pharmaceuticals	FLT3-positive acute myeloid leukemia
Brigatinib	Takeda Pharmaceuticals	ALK-positive non-small cell lung cancer
Durvalumab	AstraZeneca UK	metastatic urothelial carcinoma
Letrozole/ribociclib	Novartis Pharmaceuticals	breast cancer
Pembrolizumab	Merck Sharp & Dohme	urothelial carcinoma
Tocilizumab	Genentech	giant cell arteritis
Pembrolizumab	Merck Sharp & Dohme	microsatellite instability-high tumors
Ceritinib	Novartis Pharmaceuticals	ALK-positive, metastatic non-small cell lung cancer
Dabrafenib	Novartis Pharmaceuticals	metastatic non-small cell lung cancer with BRAF V600E mutation
Trametinib	Novartis Pharmaceuticals	metastatic non-small cell lung cancer with BRAF V600E mutation
Ibrutinib	Pharmacyclics	chronic graft-versus-host disease
Glecaprevir/pibrentasvir	AbbVie	hepatitis C
Cytarabine/daunorubicin	Celator Pharmaceuticals	acute myeloid leukemia
Inotuzumab ozogamicin	Wyeth Pharmaceuticals	B-cell precursor acute lymphoblastic leukemia
Deutetrabenazine	Teva Pharmaceuticals	tardive dyskinesia
Abemaciclib	Eli Lilly	breast cancer
Acalabrutinib	AstraZeneca UK	mantle cell lymphoma
Vemurafenib	Hoffmann-La Roche	Erdheim-Chester disease with BRAF V600 mutation
Alectinib	Hoffmann-La Roche	ALK-positive, metastatic non-small cell lung cancer
Letermovir	Merck Sharp & Dohme	cytomegalovirus infection
Brentuximab vedotin	Seattle Genetics	anaplastic large-cell lymphoma
Emicizumab	Genentech	hemophilia
Nivolumab	Bristol-Myers Squibb	melanoma

== 2016 ==
Drug	Manufacturer	Indication
Elbasvir/grazoprevir	Merck Sharp & Dohme	Hepatitis C
Palbociclib	Pfizer	HR-positive, HER2-negative breast cancer
Crizotinib	PF Prism	ROS1-positive NSCLC
Venetoclax	AbbVie	CLL with 17p deletion
Cabozantinib	Exelixis	renal cell carcinoma
Pimavanserin	Acadia Pharmaceuticals	Parkinson's disease-related psychosis
Ibrutinib	Pharmacyclics	small lymphocytic lymphoma (SLL) with 17p deletion
Lenvatinib	Eisai	renal cell carcinoma
Nivolumab	Bristol-Myers Squibb	Hodgkin lymphoma
Atezolizumab	Genentech	urothelial carcinoma
Sofosbuvir/velpatasvir	Gilead Sciences	chronic hepatitis C virus genotypes 1, 2, 3, 4, 5 or 6 infection
Canakinumab	Novartis	Familial mediterranean fever
Canakinumab	Novartis	Hyper-IgD syndrome
Canakinumab	Novartis	TNF receptor associated periodic syndrome
Lumacaftor/ivacaftor	Vertex Pharmaceuticals	cystic fibrosis with CFTR F508del
Atezolizumab	Genentech	metastatic NSCLC
Olaratumab	Eli Lilly	soft-tissue sarcoma
Nivolumab	Bristol-Myers Squibb	head and neck cancer
Daratumumab	Janssen	multiple myeloma
Rucaparib	Clovis Oncology	BRCA-mutated ovarian cancer

== 2015 ==
Drug	Manufacturer	Indication
Ibrutinib	Pharmacyclics	Waldenstrom’s macroglobulinemia
Palbociclib	Pfizer	ER-positive, HER2-negative breast cancer
Ranibizumab	Genentech	diabetic retinopathy
Ivacaftor	Vertex Pharmaceuticals	cystic fibrosis with a variety of CFTR mutations
Aflibercept	Regeneron Pharmaceuticals	diabetic retinopathy
Sirolimus	PF Prism	lymphangioleiomyomatosis
Sirolimus	PF Prism	lymphangioleiomyomatosis
Lumacaftor/ivacaftor	Vertex Pharmaceuticals	cystic fibrosis with CFTR F508del mutation
Ombitasvir/paritaprevir/ritonavir	AbbVie	Hepatitis C
Uridine triacetate	Wellstat Therapeutics	hereditary orotic aciduria
Pembrolizumab	Merck Sharp & Dohme	PDL-1 positive NSCLC
Nivolumab	Bristol-Myers Squibb	metastatic NSCLC
Idarucizumab	Boehringer Ingelheim	reversal of dabigatran
Asfotase alfa	Alexion Pharmaceuticals	perinatal/infantile/childhood hypophosphatasia
Osimertinib	AstraZeneca	EGFR-positive NSCLC
Daratumumab	Janssen Biotech	multiple myeloma
Nivolumab	Bristol-Myers Squibb	advanced renal cell carcinoma
Elotuzumab	Bristol-Myers Squibb	multiple myeloma
Sebelipase alfa	Alexion Pharmaceuticals	lysosomal acid lipase deficiency
Alectinib	Hoffmann-La Roche	ALK-mutated NSCLC
Pembrolizumab	Merck Sharp & Dohme	metastatic melanoma

== 2014 ==
Drug	Manufacturer	Indication
Ivacaftor	Vertex Pharmaceuticals	cystic fibrosis with CFTR mutation
Ofatumumab	Novartis Pharmaceuticals	chronic lymphocytic leukemia
Ceritinib	Novartis Pharmaceuticals	ALK-positive metastatic non-small cell lung cancer
Idelalisib	Gilead Sciences	relapsed chronic lymphocytic leukemia
Ibrutinib	Pharmacyclics	chronic lymphocytic leukemia (with 17p deletion
Eltrombopag	Novartis Pharmaceuticals	aplastic anemia
Pembrolizumab	Merck	metastatic melanoma
Ledipasvir/sofosbuvir	Gilead Sciences	Hepatitis C
Pirfenidone	Genentech	idiopathic pulmonary fibrosis
Nintedanib	Boehringer Ingelheim	idiopathic pulmonary fibrosis
Blinatumomab	Amgen	acute lymphoblastic leukemia
Ombitasvir/paritaprevir/ritonavir/dasabuvir	AbbVie	Hepatitis C
Nivolumab	Bristol-Myers Squibb	metastatic melanoma
Ivacaftor	Vertex Pharmaceuticals	cystic fibrosis with CFTR R117H mutation

== 2013 ==
Drug	Manufacturer	Indication
Obinutuzumab	Genentech	chronic lymphocytic leukemia
Ibrutinib	Pharmacyclics	mantle cell lymphoma
Sofosbuvir	Gilead Sciences	Hepatitis C
