= Crinecerfont =

Pharmaceutical compound

Clinical data
- Trade names: Crenessity
- Other names: SSR-125543, NBI-74788
- AHFS/Drugs.com: Monograph
- MedlinePlus: a625009
- License data: US DailyMed: Crinecerfont
- Routes of administration: By mouth
- Drug class: Corticotropin-releasing factor type 1 receptor antagonist
- ATC code: None

Legal status
- Legal status: US: ℞-only

Identifiers
- IUPAC name: 4-(2-Chloro-4-methoxy-5-methylphenyl)-N-[(1S)-2-cyclopropyl-1-(3-fluoro-4-methylphenyl)ethyl]-5-methyl-N-prop-2-ynyl-1,3-thiazol-2-amine
- CAS Number: 752253-39-7
- PubChem CID: 5282340
- DrugBank: DB18518
- ChemSpider: 4445507
- UNII: MFT24BX55I
- KEGG: D12366
- ChEBI: CHEBI:34969
- ChEMBL: ChEMBL291657
- CompTox Dashboard (EPA): DTXSID10996687

Chemical and physical data
- Formula: C_{27}H_{28}ClFN_{2}OS
- Molar mass: 483.04 g·mol^{−1}
- 3D model (JSmol): Interactive image
- SMILES: FC1=CC(=CC=C1C)C(N(C2=NC(C=3C=C(C(OC)=CC3Cl)C)=C(S2)C)CC#C)CC4CC4
- InChI: InChI=1S/C27H28ClFN2OS/c1-6-11-31(24(13-19-8-9-19)20-10-7-16(2)23(29)14-20)27-30-26(18(4)33-27)21-12-17(3)25(32-5)15-22(21)28/h1,7,10,12,14-15,19,24H,8-9,11,13H2,2-5H3/t24-/m0/s1; Key:IEAKXXNRGSLYTQ-DEOSSOPVSA-N

Crinecerfont, sold under the brand name Crenessity, is a medication used for the treatment of congenital adrenal hyperplasia. It is a corticotropin-releasing factor type 1 receptor (CRF1R) antagonist developed to treat classic congenital adrenal hyperplasia due to 21-hydroxylase deficiency (21OHD). It is taken by mouth.

The most common side effects of crinecerfont in adults include fatigue, dizziness, and arthralgia (joint pain). For children, the most common side effects include headache, abdominal pain, and fatigue.

Crinecerfont was approved for medical use in the United States in December 2024. The US Food and Drug Administration (FDA) considers it to be a first-in-class medication.

== Medical uses ==
Crinecerfont is indicated as adjunctive treatment to glucocorticoid replacement to control androgens in people aged four years of age and older with classic congenital adrenal hyperplasia.

== Adverse effects ==
The US prescribing information for crinecerfont has a warning for acute adrenal insufficiency or adrenal crisis.

== History ==
Crinecerfont's approval is based on two randomized, double-blind, placebo-controlled trials in 182 adults and 103 children with classic congenital adrenal hyperplasia. In the first trial, 122 adults received crinecerfont twice daily and 60 received placebo twice daily for 24 weeks. After the first four weeks of the trial, the glucocorticoid dose was reduced to replacement levels, then adjusted based on levels of androstenedione, an androgen hormone. The primary measure of efficacy was the change from baseline in the total glucocorticoid daily dose while maintaining androstenedione control at the end of the trial. The group that received crinecerfont reduced their daily glucocorticoid dose by 27% while maintaining control of androstenedione levels, compared to a 10% daily glucocorticoid dose reduction in the group that received placebo.

In the second trial, 69 children received crinecerfont twice daily and 34 received placebo twice daily for 28 weeks. The primary measure of efficacy was the change from baseline in serum androstenedione at week four. The group that received crinecerfont experienced a statistically significant reduction from baseline in serum androstenedione, compared to an average increase from baseline in the placebo group. At the end of the trial, children assigned to crinecerfont were able to reduce their daily glucocorticoid dose by 18% while maintaining control of androstenedione levels compared to an almost 6% daily glucocorticoid dose increase in children assigned to placebo.

The adult trial was conducted at 54 sites in 16 countries in North America, Europe, and Asia. The pediatric trial was conducted at 37 sites in 10 countries in North America and Europe. Of the 285 participants, 127 (45%) were from the United States. Findings from both clinical trials established crinecerfont safety and efficacy.

The US Food and Drug Administration (FDA) granted the application for crinecerfont fast track, breakthrough therapy, orphan drug, and priority review designations. The FDA granted the approval of Crenessity to Neurocrine Biosciences, Inc.

== Society and culture ==
=== Legal status ===
Crinecerfont was approved for medical use in the United States in December 2024.

=== Names ===
Crinecerfont is the international nonproprietary name.

Crinecerfont is sold under the brand name Crenessity.
