= Zongertinib =

Medication

Clinical data
- Trade names: Hernexeos
- Other names: BI-1810631, BI1810631
- License data: US DailyMed: Zongertinib
- Routes of administration: By mouth
- Drug class: Antineoplastic, epidermal growth factor receptor 2 (HER2) inhibitor
- ATC code: L01EH04 (WHO)

Legal status
- Legal status: US: ℞-only

Identifiers
- IUPAC name: N-(1-{4-[3-methyl-4-(1-methylbenzimidazol-5-yl)oxyanilino]pyrimido[5,4-d]pyrimidin-6-yl}piperidin-4-yl)prop-2-enamide
- CAS Number: 2728667-27-2
- PubChem CID: 160283094
- DrugBank: DB18762
- ChemSpider: 128921192
- UNII: DRH7R67UVL
- KEGG: D12879
- ChEMBL: ChEMBL5314498

Chemical and physical data
- Formula: C_{29}H_{29}N_{9}O_{2}
- Molar mass: 535.612 g·mol^{−1}
- 3D model (JSmol): Interactive image
- SMILES: C=CC(=O)NC1CCN(c2ncc3ncnc(Nc4ccc(Oc5ccc6c(c5)ncn6C)c(C)c4)c3n2)CC1
- InChI: InChI=1S/C29H29N9O2/c1-4-26(39)34-19-9-11-38(12-10-19)29-30-15-23-27(36-29)28(32-16-31-23)35-20-5-8-25(18(2)13-20)40-21-6-7-24-22(14-21)33-17-37(24)3/h4-8,13-17,19H,1,9-12H2,2-3H3,(H,34,39)(H,31,32,35); Key:YSGNGFPNTLERCR-UHFFFAOYSA-N

Zongertinib, sold under the brand name Hernexeos, is an anti-cancer medication used for the treatment of non-small cell lung cancer. Zongertinib is a kinase inhibitor of human epidermal growth factor receptor 2 (HER2). It is taken by mouth.

Zongertinib was approved for medical use in the United States in August 2025.

== Medical uses ==
Zongertinib is indicated for the treatment of adults with unresectable or metastatic non-squamous non-small cell lung cancer whose tumors have HER2 (ERBB2) tyrosine kinase domain activating mutations, as detected by an FDA-approved test, and who have received prior systemic therapy.

== Adverse effects ==
The US Food and Drug Administration prescribing information includes warnings and precautions for hepatotoxicity, left ventricular dysfunction, interstitial lung disease/pneumonitis, and embryo-fetal toxicity.

== History ==
Efficacy was evaluated in participants with unresectable or metastatic, non-squamous non-small cell lung cancer with HER2 (ERBB2) TKD mutations who had received prior systemic therapy and received zongertinib in Beamion LUNG-1 (NCT04886804), an open-label, multi-center, multi-cohort trial. The major efficacy outcome measures were objective response rate (ORR) and duration of response (DOR) determined by blinded independent central review per RECIST v1.1.

The US Food and Drug Administration granted the application for zongertinib priority review, breakthrough therapy, and fast track designations.

== Society and culture ==
=== Legal status ===
Zongertinib was approved for medical use in the United States in August 2025.

=== Names ===
Zongertinib is the international nonproprietary name and the United States Adopted Name.

Zongertinib is sold under the brand name Hernexeos.
