= Tucatinib =

Chemical compound

Clinical data
- Pronunciation: /tuˈkætɪnɪb/ too-KAT-in-ib
- Trade names: Tukysa
- Other names: ONT-380, ARRY-380
- AHFS/Drugs.com: Monograph
- MedlinePlus: a620032
- License data: US DailyMed: Tucatinib
- Pregnancy category: AU: D
- Routes of administration: By mouth
- ATC code: L01EH03 (WHO)

Legal status
- Legal status: AU: S4 (Prescription only); CA: ℞-only; US: ℞-only; EU: Rx-only

Identifiers
- IUPAC name: N'-(4,4-dimethyl-5H-1,3-oxazol-2-yl)-N-{3-methyl-4-[([1,2,4]triazolo[1,5-a]pyridin-7-yl)oxy]phenyl}quinazoline-4,6-diamine
- CAS Number: 937263-43-9
- PubChem CID: 51039094
- DrugBank: DB11652
- ChemSpider: 34995558
- UNII: 234248D0HH
- KEGG: D11141
- ChEMBL: ChEMBL3989868
- CompTox Dashboard (EPA): DTXSID601027958

Chemical and physical data
- Formula: C_{26}H_{24}N_{8}O_{2}
- Molar mass: 480.532 g·mol^{−1}
- 3D model (JSmol): Interactive image
- SMILES: Cc1cc(Nc2ncnc3ccc(NC4=NC(C)(C)CO4)cc23)ccc1Oc1ccn2ncnc2c1
- InChI: InChI=1S/C26H24N8O2/c1-16-10-17(5-7-22(16)36-19-8-9-34-23(12-19)28-15-30-34)31-24-20-11-18(4-6-21(20)27-14-29-24)32-25-33-26(2,3)13-35-25/h4-12,14-15H,13H2,1-3H3,(H,32,33)(H,27,29,31); Key:SDEAXTCZPQIFQM-UHFFFAOYSA-N

Tucatinib, sold under the brand name Tukysa, is an anticancer medication used for the treatment of HER2-positive breast cancer. It is a small molecule inhibitor of HER2. It was developed by Array BioPharma and licensed to Cascadian Therapeutics (formerly Oncothyreon, subsequently part of Seattle Genetics).

Common side effects include diarrhea, palmar-plantar erythrodysesthesia (burning or tingling discomfort in the hands and feet), nausea, fatigue, hepatotoxicity (liver damage), vomiting, stomatitis (inflammation of the mouth and lips), decreased appetite, abdominal pain, headache, anemia and rash. Tucatinib may cause harm to a developing fetus or baby.

Tucatinib was approved for medical use in the United States in April 2020, in Australia in August 2020, and in the European Union in February 2021.

== Medical uses ==
Tucatinib is a kinase inhibitor indicated in combination with trastuzumab and capecitabine for the treatment of adults with advanced unresectable or metastatic HER2-positive breast cancer, including those with brain metastases, who have received one or more prior anti-HER2-based regimens in the metastatic setting.

In the European Union, it is indicated in combination with trastuzumab and capecitabine for the treatment of adults with HER2‑positive locally advanced or metastatic breast cancer who have received at least two prior anti‑HER2 treatment regimens.

In January 2023, the US Food and Drug Administration (FDA) granted accelerated approval to tucatinib in combination with trastuzumab for RAS wild-type HER2-positive unresectable or metastatic colorectal cancer that has progressed following fluoropyrimidine-, oxaliplatin-, and irinotecan-based chemotherapy.

== Clinical trials ==
Two early stage clinical trials have reported encouraging results, both of which had options to enroll subjects with central nervous system (CNS) metastases. HER2CLIMB is a Phase 2 randomized, double-blinded, placebo-controlled study of tucatinib in combination with trastuzumab and capecitabine in patients with pretreated, unresectable locally advanced or metastatic HER2-positive breast cancer.

== History ==
In April 2020, the U.S. Food and Drug Administration (FDA) approved tucatinib in combination with chemotherapy (trastuzumab and capecitabine) for the treatment of adults with advanced forms of HER2-positive breast cancer that can't be removed with surgery, or has spread to other parts of the body, including the brain, and who have received one or more prior treatments.

The FDA collaborated with the Australian Therapeutic Goods Administration (TGA), Health Canada, Health Sciences Authority (HSA, Singapore) and Swissmedic (SMC, Switzerland) on the review. This was the first Project Orbis partnership between the FDA, HSA and Swissmedic. As of 17 April 2020, the application is still under review at the other agencies.

Tucatinib is a kinase inhibitor meaning it blocks a type of enzyme (kinase) and helps prevent the cancer cells from growing. Tucatinib is approved for treatment after adults have taken one or more anti-HER2-based regimens in the metastatic setting. The FDA approved tucatinib based on the results of the HER2CLIMB trial (NCT02614794) enrolling 612 subjects who had HER2-positive advanced unresectable or metastatic breast cancer and had prior treatment with trastuzumab, pertuzumab and ado-trastuzumab emtansine (T-DM1). Subjects with previously treated and stable brain metastases, as well as those with previously treated and growing or untreated brain metastases, were eligible for the clinical trial, and 48% of enrolled subjects had brain metastases at the start of the trial.

Subjects received either tucatinib 300 mg twice daily plus trastuzumab and capecitabine (tucatinib arm, n=410) or placebo plus trastuzumab and capecitabine (control arm, n=202). The primary endpoint was progression-free survival (PFS), or the amount of time when there was no growth of the tumor, assessed by a blinded independent central review, evaluated in the initial 480 randomized patients. The median PFS in subjects who received tucatinib, trastuzumab, and capecitabine was 7.8 months (95% CI: 7.5, 9.6) compared to 5.6 months (95% CI: 4.2, 7.1) in those subjects who received placebo, trastuzumab, and capecitabine (HR 0.54; 95% CI: 0.42, 0.71; p<0.00001). Overall survival and PFS in subjects with brain metastases at baseline were key secondary endpoints. The median overall survival in subjects who received tucatinib, trastuzumab, and capecitabine was 21.9 months (95% CI: 18.3, 31.0) compared to 17.4 months (95% CI: 13.6, 19.9) in subjects who received placebo, trastuzumab, and capecitabine (HR: 0.66; 95% CI: 0.50, 0.87; p=0.00480). The median PFS in subjects with brain metastases at baseline who received tucatinib, trastuzumab and capecitabine was 7.6 months (95% CI: 6.2, 9.5) compared to 5.4 months (95% CI: 4.1, 5.7) in subjects who received placebo, trastuzumab and capecitabine (HR: 0.48; 0.34, 0.69; p<0.00001).

The FDA granted the application for tucatinib priority review, breakthrough therapy, fast track, and orphan drug designations. The FDA granted approval of Tukysa to Seattle Genetics, Inc.

== Society and culture ==
=== Economics ===
Tucatinib was denied entry into the Australian Pharmaceutical Benefits Scheme in March 2021, as "the incremental cost effectiveness ratio was unacceptably high at the proposed price".

=== Legal status ===
Tucatinib was approved for medical use in the United States in April 2020.

Tucatinib was approved for medical use in Australia in August 2020.

On 10 December 2020, the Committee for Medicinal Products for Human Use (CHMP) of the European Medicines Agency (EMA) adopted a positive opinion, recommending the granting of a marketing authorization for the medicinal product Tukysa, intended for the treatment of HER2-positive locally advanced or metastatic breast cancer. The applicant for this medicinal product is Seagen B.V. Tucatinib was approved for medical use in the European Union in February 2021.

=== Names ===
Tucatinib is the International nonproprietary name.
