= Zidesamtinib =

Anti-cancer medication

Clinical data
- Trade names: Jideytro
- Other names: NUV-520; NVL-520
- AHFS/Drugs.com: jideytro
- License data: US DailyMed: Zidesamtinib
- Routes of administration: By mouth
- Drug class: Tyrosine kinase inhibitor
- ATC code: None

Legal status
- Legal status: US: ℞-only

Identifiers
- IUPAC name: (19R)-3-Ethyl-16-fluoro-10,19-dimethyl-20-oxa-3,4,9,10,11,23-hexazapentacyclo[19.3.1.02,6.08,12.013,18]pentacosa-1(25),2(6),4,8,11,13(18),14,16,21,23-decaen-22-amine
- CAS Number: 2739829-00-4
- PubChem CID: 166560233
- IUPHAR/BPS: 12392
- DrugBank: DB21623
- ChemSpider: 128922073
- UNII: MX5KQV5XHC
- KEGG: D12899
- ChEBI: CHEBI:747901
- ChEMBL: ChEMBL5314497
- PDB ligand: A1I6Z (PDBe, RCSB PDB)

Chemical and physical data
- Formula: C_{22}H_{22}FN_{7}O
- Molar mass: 419.464 g·mol^{−1}
- 3D model (JSmol): Interactive image
- SMILES: CCN1C2=C(CC3=NN(N=C3C4=C(C=C(C=C4)F)[C@H](OC5=C(N=CC2=C5)N)C)C)C=N1
- InChI: InChI=1S/C22H22FN7O/c1-4-30-21-13(11-26-30)7-18-20(28-29(3)27-18)16-6-5-15(23)9-17(16)12(2)31-19-8-14(21)10-25-22(19)24/h5-6,8-12H,4,7H2,1-3H3,(H2,24,25)/t12-/m1/s1; Key:DTWUUAFTYSMNQX-GFCCVEGCSA-N

Zidesamtinib, sold under the brand name Jideytro, is an anti-cancer medication used for the treatment of non-small cell lung cancer. Zidesamtinib is a kinase inhibitor. It is taken by mouth.

Zidesamtinib was approved for medical use in the United States in July 2026.

== Medical uses ==
Zidesamtinib is indicated for the treatment of adults with locally advanced or metastatic ROS1-positive non-small cell lung cancer who have received a prior ROS1 kinase inhibitor.

== Adverse effects ==
The US prescription label includes warnings and precautions for central nervous system adverse reactions, QTc interval prolongation, interstitial lung disease/pneumonitis, skeletal fractures, myalgia with creatine phosphokinase elevation, pancreatic toxicity, and embryo-fetal toxicity.

== Mechanism of action ==
Zidesamtinib is a kinase inhibitor that works by blocking ROS1, an abnormal protein that drives some lung cancers to grow, including forms that have become resistant to earlier ROS1 treatments. Zidesamtinib also works on the related protein ALK. In laboratory and animal studies, zidesamtinib stopped cancer cells with ROS1 changes from growing and slowed tumor growth, including tumors in the brain.

== History ==
Efficacy was evaluated in ARROS-1 (NCT05118789), a multi-center, single-arm, open-label, multi-cohort trial in participants with previously treated locally advanced or metastatic ROS1-positive NSCLC. The efficacy population included 117 participants; 59 who received one prior ROS1 tyrosine kinase inhibitor and 58 who received two or more prior ROS1 tyrosine kinase inhibitors, including lorlatinib, repotrectinib, and/or taletrectinib.

== Society and culture ==
=== Legal status ===
Zidesamtinib was approved for medical use in the United States in July 2026. The US Food and Drug Administration granted the application for zidesamtinib orphan drug designation.

=== Names ===
Zidesamtinib is the international nonproprietary name.

Zidesamtinib is sold under the brand name Jideytro.
