= Repotrectinib =

Medication

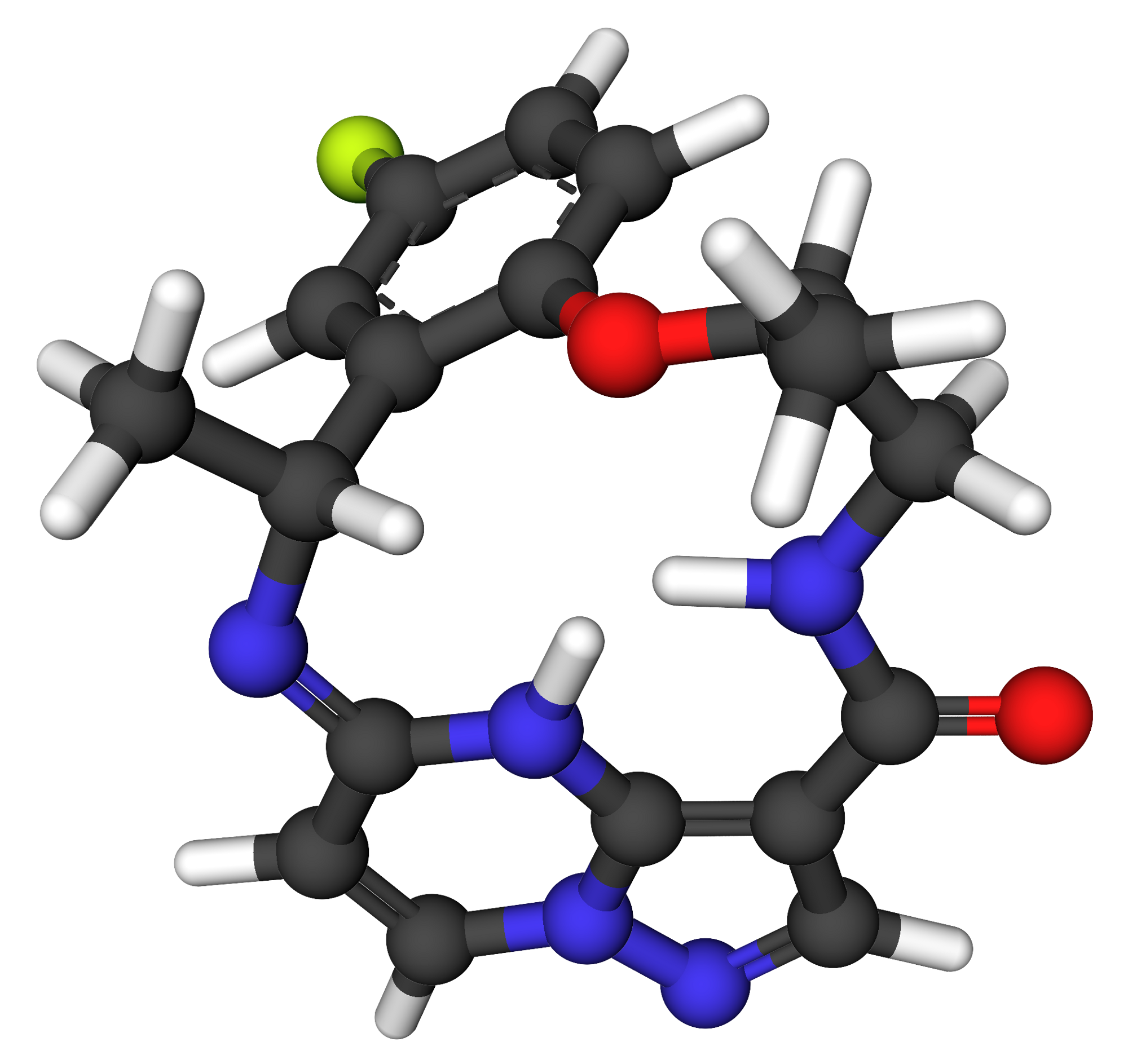

Clinical data
- Trade names: Augtyro
- Other names: TPX-0005
- AHFS/Drugs.com: Monograph
- MedlinePlus: a623063
- License data: US DailyMed: Repotrectinib
- Routes of administration: By mouth
- Drug class: Tyrosine kinase inhibitor
- ATC code: L01EX28 (WHO)

Legal status
- Legal status: AU: S4 (Prescription only); CA: ℞-only; US: ℞-only; EU: Rx-only

Identifiers
- IUPAC name: (3R,6S)-4^{5}-fluoro-3,6-dimethyl-5-oxa-2,8-diaza-1(5,3)-pyrazolo[1,5-a]pyrimidina-4(1,2)-benzenacyclononaphan-9-one
- CAS Number: 1802220-02-5
- PubChem CID: 135565923
- DrugBank: DB16826
- ChemSpider: 64853849
- UNII: 08O3FQ4UNP
- KEGG: D11454
- ChEBI: CHEBI:229220
- ChEMBL: ChEMBL4298138
- PDB ligand: 7GI (PDBe, RCSB PDB)

Chemical and physical data
- Formula: C_{18}H_{18}FN_{5}O_{2}
- Molar mass: 355.373 g·mol^{−1}
- 3D model (JSmol): Interactive image
- SMILES: C[C@H]1CNC(=O)c2cnn3ccc(nc23)N[C@H](C)c2cc(F)ccc2O1
- InChI: InChI=1S/C18H18FN5O2/c1-10-8-20-18(25)14-9-21-24-6-5-16(23-17(14)24)22-11(2)13-7-12(19)3-4-15(13)26-10/h3-7,9-11H,8H2,1-2H3,(H,20,25)(H,22,23)/t10-,11+/m0/s1; Key:FIKPXCOQUIZNHB-WDEREUQCSA-N

Repotrectinib, sold under the brand name Augtyro, is an anti-cancer medication used for the treatment of non-small cell lung cancer. It is taken by mouth. Repotrectinib is an inhibitor of proto-oncogene tyrosine-protein kinase ROS1 (ROS1) and of the tropomyosin receptor tyrosine kinases (TRKs) TRKA, TRKB, and TRKC.

The most common adverse reactions include dizziness, dysgeusia, peripheral neuropathy, constipation, dyspnea, ataxia, fatigue, cognitive disorders, and muscular weakness.

Repotrectinib was approved for medical use in the United States in November 2023, and in the European Union in January 2025.

== Medical uses ==
Repotrectinib is indicated for the treatment of adults with locally advanced or metastatic ROS1-positive non-small cell lung cancer.

In June 2024, the US Food and Drug Administration (FDA) expanded the indication to include the treatment of people twelve years of age and older with solid tumors that have a neurotrophic tyrosine receptor kinase (NTRK) gene fusion, are locally advanced or metastatic or where surgical resection is likely to result in severe morbidity, and that have progressed following treatment or have no satisfactory alternative therapy.

== Side effects ==
The most common adverse reactions include dizziness, dysgeusia, peripheral neuropathy, constipation, dyspnea, fatigue, ataxia, cognitive impairment, muscular weakness, and nausea.

== History ==
Approval by the US Food and Drug Administration (FDA) was based on TRIDENT-1, a global, multicenter, single-arm, open-label, multi-cohort clinical trial (NCT03093116) which included participants with ROS1-positive locally advanced or metastatic non-small cell lung cancer. Efficacy was evaluated in 71 ROS1 tyrosine kinase inhibitor-naïve participants who received up to one prior line of platinum-based chemotherapy and/or immunotherapy and 56 participants who received one prior ROS1 tyrosine kinase inhibitor with no prior platinum-based chemotherapy or immunotherapy.

The FDA granted the application for repotrectinib priority review, breakthrough therapy, and fast track designations.

=== Clinical trials ===
==== TRIDENT-1 ====
Efficacy was evaluated in TRIDENT-1 (NCT03093116), a multicenter, single-arm, open-label, multi-cohort trial in 88 adult participants with locally advanced or metastatic neurotrophic tyrosine receptor kinase gene fusion-positive solid tumors who had either received a prior TRK tyrosine kinase inhibitor (TKI) (n=48) or were TKI-naïve (n=40). All participants were assessed for central nervous (CNS) lesions at baseline, and patients with symptomatic brain metastases were excluded. Tumor assessments were performed every eight weeks.

== Society and culture ==
=== Legal status ===
In November 2024, the Committee for Medicinal Products for Human Use of the European Medicines Agency adopted a positive opinion, recommending the granting of a conditional marketing authorization for the medicinal product Augtyro, intended for the treatment of people whose solid tumors have a neurotrophic tyrosine receptor kinase (NTRK) gene fusion, or people with ROS1-positive advanced non-small cell lung cancer (NSCLC). The applicant for this medicinal product is Bristol-Myers Squibb Pharma EEIG. Repotrectinib was authorized for medical use in the European Union in January 2025.
