= Sunvozertinib =

Pharmaceutical drug

Clinical data
- Trade names: Zegfrovy, others
- AHFS/Drugs.com: Zegfrovy
- Routes of administration: By mouth
- ATC code: None

Legal status
- Legal status: US: ℞-only; Rx in China

Identifiers
- IUPAC name: N-[5-[[4-[5-chloro-4-fluoro-2-(2-hydroxypropan-2-yl)anilino]pyrimidin-2-yl]amino]-2-[(3R)-3-(dimethylamino)pyrrolidin-1-yl]-4-methoxyphenyl]prop-2-enamide
- CAS Number: 2370013-12-8
- PubChem CID: 139377809
- DrugBank: DB18925
- ChemSpider: 115009350
- UNII: L1Q2K5JYO8
- KEGG: D12506

Chemical and physical data
- Formula: C_{29}H_{35}ClFN_{7}O_{3}
- Molar mass: 584.09 g·mol^{−1}
- 3D model (JSmol): Interactive image
- SMILES: COC1=CC(N2CC[C@H](C2)N(C)C)=C(NC(=O)C=C)C=C1NC1=NC=CC(NC2=CC(Cl)=C(F)C=C2C(C)(C)O)=N1
- InChI: InChI=1S/C29H35ClFN7O3/c1-7-27(39)34-22-14-23(25(41-6)15-24(22)38-11-9-17(16-38)37(4)5)35-28-32-10-8-26(36-28)33-21-13-19(30)20(31)12-18(21)29(2,3)40/h7-8,10,12-15,17,40H,1,9,11,16H2,2-6H3,(H,34,39)(H2,32,33,35,36)/t17-/m1/s1; Key:BTMKEDDEMKKSEF-QGZVFWFLSA-N

Sunvozertinib is an anti-cancer medication used for the treatment of non-small-cell lung cancer. It is an epidermal growth factor receptor (EGFR) tyrosine kinase inhibitor.

Sunvozertinib was approved for medical use in the United States in July 2025.

== Medical uses ==
In the US, sunvozertinib is indicated for the treatment of adults with locally advanced or metastatic non-small cell lung cancer with epidermal growth factor receptor exon 20 insertion mutations, as detected by an FDA-approved test, whose disease has progressed on or after platinum-based chemotherapy.

== Side effects ==
The US Food and Drug Administration (FDA) prescribing information for sunvozertinib includes warnings and precautions for interstitial lung disease/pneumonitis, gastrointestinal adverse reactions, dermatologic adverse reactions, ocular toxicity, and embryo-fetal toxicity.

== History ==
Sunvozertinib is being developed by Dizal Pharmaceutical. In China, it was conditionally approved in 2023 for the treatment of non-small cell lung cancer (NSCLC) and full approval is contingent on results of phase III clinical trials. In the United States, it has been designated by the Food and Drug Administration (FDA) as a breakthrough therapy for patients with locally advanced or metastatic NSCLCs with an EGFR exon 20 insertion mutation.

Efficacy was evaluated in WU-KONG1B (NCT03974022), a multinational, open-label, dose randomization trial. Eligible participants had locally advanced or metastatic non-small cell lung cancer with epidermal growth factor receptor exon 20 insertion mutations with disease progression on or after platinum-based chemotherapy. The primary efficacy population was in 85 participants who received sunvozertinib 200 mg orally once daily with food until disease progression or intolerable toxicity.

The FDA granted the application for sunvozertinib priority review and breakthrough therapy designations.
