= Incyte =

American pharmaceutical company

Incyte Corporation
- Type: Public
- Traded as: Nasdaq: INCY; S&P 500 component
- Industry: pharmaceuticals
- Founded: 2002; 24 years ago
- Founder: Roy A. Whitfield
- Headquarters: Wilmington, Delaware, U.S.
- Key people: Bill Meury (CEO & president)
- Revenue: ▲US$4.24 billion (2024)
- Operating income: ▼US$61.4 million (2024)
- Net income: ▼US$32.6 million (2024)
- Total assets: ▼US$5.44 billion (2024)
- Total equity: ▼US$3.45 billion (2024)
- Number of employees: 2,617 (2024)
- Website: incyte.com

Incyte Corporation is an American multinational pharmaceutical company with headquarters in Wilmington, Delaware. The company currently operates manufacturing and R&D locations in North America, Europe, and Asia.

Incyte Corporation currently develops and manufactures prescription biopharmaceutical medications in multiple therapeutic areas including oncology, inflammation, and autoimmunity.

== History ==
Incyte Corporation was founded by Roy A. Whitfield on April 8, 1991, in Palo Alto, California, as a genomics company. It became a public company in 1993. Subsequently, scientists and chemists were recruited from DuPont to work for Incyte. Incyte moved its headquarters to Delaware, and acquired Maxia Pharmaceuticals in 2003.

In November 2013, Incyte announced its relocation to new headquarters in Wilmington, Delaware, completing the move by the end of 2014. Hervé Hoppenot became CEO in January 2014.

In 2017, the company became part of the S&P 500 Index, which tracks the 500 most widely held U.S. stocks.

In 2015, Incyte established its European headquarters in Geneva, Switzerland, and later moved this headquarters in 2021. The company expanded its Delaware headquarters, including the addition of a research and development facility, in 2022. Incyte acquired Villaris Therapeutics in 2022, and Escient Pharmaceuticals in 2024.

For 2025, the company reported $5.141 billion in revenue, $6.957 billion in assets and $1.286 billion in net income. Incyte is publicly traded on the NASDAQ under the symbol INCY. Incyte now operates out of North America, Asia, and Europe. Bill Meury became CEO in 2025. Meury replaced Hoppenot, who retired after 11 years in the position.

== Pharmaceuticals ==
Incyte Corporation currently has seven marketed and co-marketed pharmaceutical products, including Jakafi (ruxolitinib), Pemazyre (pemigatinib), Monjuvi (tafasitamab-cxix), Opzelura (Ruxolitinib), Tabrecta (capmatinib), Olumiant (Baricitinib), and Iclusig (ponatinib). In 2013, Novartis acquired Incyte's c-Met inhibitor capmatinib (INC280, INCB028060), which is marketed under the brand name Tabrecta.

As of 2014, the company was developing baricitinib, an oral JAK1 and JAK2 inhibitor drug for rheumatoid arthritis in partnership with Eli Lilly. It gained EU approval in February 2017. In April 2017, the US FDA issued a rejection, citing concerns about dosing and safety. In May 2018, baricitinib was approved in the United States for the treatment of rheumatoid arthritis under the brand name Olumiant.

As of 2016 epacadostat, an indoleamine 2,3-dioxygenase (IDO1) inhibitor, was in development for various cancers and was in combination trials with Merck's pembrolizumab (Keytruda) and Bristol Myers Squibb's nivolumab (Opdivo).

== Acquisition history ==
Incyte has made a total of 3 acquisitions.

- Maxia Pharmaceuticals (2003): An early acquisition in Incyte's history, the company purchased Maxia in 2003 for $42 million.
- Villaris Therapeutics (2022): This acquisition was valued at approximately $1.4 billion and included an upfront payment along with milestones. It added new assets to Incyte's portfolio for treating vitiligo and other autoimmune conditions.
- Escient Pharmaceuticals (2024): In May 2024, Incyte acquired this San Diego-based, clinical-stage company for $750 million. The acquisition provided Incyte with two oral drug candidates for inflammatory diseases, EP262 and EP547.
