= Plozasiran =

Medication

Clinical data
- Trade names: Redemplo
- Other names: ARO-APOC3
- AHFS/Drugs.com: Monograph
- MedlinePlus: a626006
- License data: US DailyMed: Plozasiran
- Routes of administration: Subcutaneous
- Drug class: Lipid-lowering agent
- ATC code: None

Legal status
- Legal status: CA: ℞-only; US: ℞-only; EU: Rx-only

Identifiers
- CAS Number: 2379776-40-4
- DrugBank: DB18997
- UNII: XG9ARL6P25
- KEGG: D13206

Plozasiran, sold under the brand name Redemplo, is a medication used for the treatment of familial chylomicronemia syndrome. Plozasiran is an apolipoprotein C-III (apoC-III)-directed small interfering ribonucleic acid (siRNA). It is given by injection under the skin (subcutaneously).

Plozasiran was approved for medical use in the United States in November 2025. The US Food and Drug Administration considers it to be a first-in-class medication.

== Medical uses ==
Plozasiran is indicated as an adjunct to diet to reduce triglycerides in adults with familial chylomicronemia syndrome.

Familial chylomicronemia syndrome is a rare genetic disorder that affects the body's ability to break down fats (triglycerides) in the bloodstream. This leads to abnormally high levels of chylomicrons, which are particles that carry triglycerides. Normal triglyceride levels are less than 150 mg/dL; levels above 500 mg/dL are considered severely high (severe hypertriglyceridemia). People with familial chylomicronemia syndrome can have triglyceride levels in the thousands. These high triglyceride levels can cause severe abdominal pain, inflammation of the pancreas (acute pancreatitis), and fatty deposits in the skin (xanthomas). Some of these symptoms, specifically acute pancreatitis, can be life-threatening.

== Side effects ==
The most common side effects include hyperglycemia (high blood sugar), headache, nausea, and injection site reaction.

== History ==
The efficacy of plozasiran was demonstrated in a randomized, placebo-controlled, double-blind trial (NCT05089084) in adults with genetically confirmed or clinically diagnosed familial chylomicronemia syndrome maintained on a low-fat diet (≤20 grams fat per day). Participants were randomly assigned to receive four total doses of plozasiran 25 mg or matching placebo, injected subcutaneously (under the skin) once every three months over a twelve-month treatment period. The primary endpoint was percent change in fasting triglycerides from baseline to month ten. The median percent change in triglycerides from baseline to month ten in the plozasiran treatment group was -59% compared to the placebo group.

The US Food and Drug Administration granted the application for plozasiran breakthrough therapy, orphan drug, and fast track designations.

== Society and culture ==
=== Legal status ===
Plozasiran was approved for medical use in the United States in November 2025.

In April 2026, the Committee for Medicinal Products for Human Use of the European Medicines Agency adopted a positive opinion, recommending the granting of a marketing authorization for the medicinal product Redemplo, intended for the treatment of adults with familial chylomicronaemia syndrome. The applicant for this medicinal product is Arrowhead Pharmaceuticals Ireland Limited. Plozasiran was designated an orphan drug. Plozasiran was authorized for medical use in the European Union in June 2026.

=== Names ===
Plozasiran is the international nonproprietary name.

Plozasiran is sold under the brand name Redemplo.
