= Tovorafenib =

Medication

Clinical data
- Trade names: Ojemda
- Other names: BIIB-024, MLN2480, AMG 2112819, DAY101, TAK-580
- AHFS/Drugs.com: Monograph
- License data: US DailyMed: Tovorafenib
- Routes of administration: By mouth
- Drug class: Antineoplastic
- ATC code: L01EC04 (WHO)

Legal status
- Legal status: CA: ℞-only; US: ℞-only; EU: Rx-only

Identifiers
- IUPAC name: 6-amino-5-chloro-N-[(1R)-1-[5-[[[5- chloro-4-(trifluoromethyl)-2-pyridinyl]amino]carbonyl]-2-thiazolyl]ethyl]-4-pyrimidinecarboxamide
- CAS Number: 1096708-71-2
- PubChem CID: 25161177
- DrugBank: DB15266
- ChemSpider: 28637796
- UNII: ZN90E4027M
- KEGG: D12291
- ChEBI: CHEBI:167672
- ChEMBL: ChEMBL3348923
- PDB ligand: QOP (PDBe, RCSB PDB)

Chemical and physical data
- Formula: C_{17}H_{12}Cl_{2}F_{3}N_{7}O_{2}S
- Molar mass: 506.29 g·mol^{−1}
- InChI: InChI=1S/C17H12Cl2F3N7O2S/c1-6(28-15(31)12-11(19)13(23)27-5-26-12)16-25-4-9(32-16)14(30)29-10-2-7(17(20,21)22)8(18)3-24-10/h2-6H,1H3,(H,28,31)(H2,23,26,27)(H,24,29,30)/t6-/m1/s1; Key:VWMJHAFYPMOMGF-ZCFIWIBFSA-N

Tovorafenib, sold under the brand name Ojemda, is a medication used for the treatment of glioma. It is a Type II RAF kinase inhibitor.

The most common adverse reactions include rash, hair color changes, fatigue, viral infection, vomiting, headache, hemorrhage, pyrexia, dry skin, constipation, nausea, dermatitis acneiform, and upper respiratory tract infection. The most common grade 3 or 4 laboratory abnormalities include decreased phosphate, decreased hemoglobin, increased creatinine phosphokinase, increased alanine aminotransferase, decreased albumin, decreased lymphocytes, decreased leukocytes, increased aspartate aminotransferase, decreased potassium, and decreased sodium.

Tovorafenib was approved for medical use in the United States in April 2024, and is the first approval of a systemic therapy for the treatment of people with pediatric low-grade glioma with BRAF rearrangements, including fusions.

== Medical uses ==
Tovorafenib is indicated for the treatment of people six months of age and older with relapsed or refractory pediatric low-grade glioma harboring a BRAF fusion or rearrangement, or BRAF V600 mutation.

== History ==
Tovorafenib was discovered in a collaboration among Sunesis Pharmaceuticals and Biogen Idec, which eventually expanded to include Millenium Pharmaceuticals, an affiliate of Takeda. In 2020, Day One Biopharmaceuticals, a company founded in 2018 to develop drugs for pediatric cancers, acquired Takeda's rights in the drug.

Day One evaluated tovorafenib in 76 participants enrolled in FIREFLY-1 (NCT04775485), a multicenter, open-label, single-arm trial in participants with relapsed or refractory pediatric low-grade glioma harboring an activating BRAF alteration detected by a local laboratory who had received at least one line of prior systemic therapy. Participants were required to have documented evidence of radiographic progression and at least one measurable lesion. Participants with tumors harboring additional activating molecular alterations (e.g., IDH1/2 mutations, FGFR mutations) or with a known or suspected diagnosis of neurofibromatosis type 1 were excluded. Participants received tovorafenib based on body surface area (range: 290 to 476 mg/m2, up to a maximum dose of 600 mg) once weekly until they experienced disease progression or unacceptable toxicity. The US Food and Drug Administration (FDA) granted the application for tovorafenib priority review, breakthrough therapy, and orphan drug designations.

== Society and culture ==
=== Legal status ===
Tovorafenib was approved for medical use in the United States in April 2024.

=== Names ===
Tovorafenib is the international nonproprietary name.

Tovorafenib is sold under the brand name Ojemda.
