= MYCO-002 =

Clinical data
- Other names: MYCO002
- Drug class: Entactogen; Empathogen

MYCO-002 is an MDMA-like entactogen that is under development for the treatment of psychiatric disorders. It is said to be being developed towards the aim of improving the safety profile of MDMA. The drug is under development by Mydecine. It was patented in July 2021 and received breakthrough therapy designation from the Food and Drug Administration (FDA) in November 2021. As of November 2021, MYCO-002 is in the preclinical research for treatment of psychiatric disorders. The chemical structure of MYCO-002 does not yet appear to have been disclosed.

== See also ==
- MYCO-006
- MYCO-007
- List of investigational hallucinogens and entactogens
