= Sevabertinib =

Medication

Clinical data
- Trade names: Hyrnuo
- Other names: BAY2927088, sevabertinib hydrate (JAN JP)
- AHFS/Drugs.com: Monograph
- MedlinePlus: a626007
- License data: US DailyMed: Sevabertinib
- Routes of administration: By mouth
- Drug class: Antineoplastic
- ATC code: L01EH06 (WHO)

Legal status
- Legal status: CA: ℞-only; US: ℞-only

Identifiers
- CAS Number: 2521285-05-0
- PubChem CID: 155234713
- DrugBank: DB21667
- ChemSpider: 129786615
- UNII: 2A7VPM5RWH
- KEGG: D13098

Chemical and physical data
- Formula: C_{24}H_{25}ClN_{4}O_{5}
- Molar mass: 484.94 g·mol^{−1}
- 3D model (JSmol): Interactive image
- SMILES: COC1=C(C=CC=C1Cl)NC2=C(NC3=C2C(=O)NCC3)C4=C(C=NC=C4)OC[C@@H]5COCCO5
- InChI: InChI=1S/C24H25ClN4O5/c1-31-23-16(25)3-2-4-18(23)29-22-20-17(6-8-27-24(20)30)28-21(22)15-5-7-26-11-19(15)34-13-14-12-32-9-10-33-14/h2-5,7,11,14,28-29H,6,8-10,12-13H2,1H3,(H,27,30)/t14-/m0/s1; Key:VYQVHWNNPKOJEA-AWEZNQCLSA-N

Sevabertinib, sold under the brand name Hyrnuo, is an anti-cancer medication used for the treatment of non-small cell lung cancer. Sevabertinib is a kinase inhibitor. It is taken by mouth.

Sevabertinib was approved for medical use in the United States in November 2025.

== Medical uses ==
Sevabertinib is indicated for the treatment of adults with locally advanced or metastatic non-squamous non-small cell lung cancer whose tumors have HER2 (ERBB2) tyrosine kinase domain activating mutations, as detected by an FDA-authorized test.

== Adverse effects ==
The US prescribing information includes warnings and precautions for diarrhea, hepatotoxicity, interstitial lung disease/pneumonitis, left ventricular dysfunction, ocular toxicity, pancreatic enzyme elevation, and embryo-fetal toxicity.

== History ==
Efficacy was evaluated in people with unresectable or metastatic, non-squamous non-small cell lung cancer with HER2 (ERBB2) tyrosine kinase domain activating mutations who had received prior systemic therapy and received sevabertinib in SOHO-01 (NCT05099172), an open-label, single-arm, multi-center, multi-cohort clinical trial. HER2 (ERBB2) activating mutations were determined in tumor tissue or plasma by local laboratories prior to enrollment.

== Society and culture ==
=== Legal status ===
Sevabertinib was approved for medical use in the United States in November 2025.

The US Food and Drug Administration granted the application for sevabertinib priority review, breakthrough therapy, and orphan drug designations.

=== Names ===
Sevabertinib is the international nonproprietary name.

Sevabertinib is sold under the brand name Hyrnuo.
