= MYCO-007 =

Clinical data
- Other names: MYCO007
- Drug class: Entactogen; Empathogen

MYCO-007 is an MDMA-like entactogen that is under development for the treatment of psychiatric disorders. It is a short-acting MDMA analogue. MYCO-007 is being developed by Mydecine. As of February 2024, it is in preclinical research. The chemical structure of MYCO-007 does not yet appear to have been disclosed. 5-BZT-MDMA (MY100) and 6-BZT-MDMA (MY101) were described in Mydecine's patent for short-acting MDMA analogues

== See also ==
- MYCO-002
- MYCO-006
- List of investigational hallucinogens and entactogens
