= Novimmune =

Swiss pharmaceutical company

Novimmune is a privately held Swiss pharmaceutical development company focusing on monoclonal antibody therapies for treatment of immune-related diseases. The company was founded in 1998.

Novimmune has six publicly disclosed drug in their pipeline:

- NI-0101, an anti-TLR4 antibody being developed in partnership with Genentech. A phase I clinical trial was completed in 2014 and phase II trials are expected to begin in early 2017.
- NI-0401, an anti-CD3ε antibody being developed in partnership with Tiziana Life Sciences. Phase II trials in patients with Crohn's disease and transplant rejection finished in 2008 and 2009, respectively.
- NI-0501, an anti-IFNγ antibody, is in development for hemophagocytic lymphohistiocytosis. A phase II/III trial began in 2013 and is ongoing. The FDA awarded breakthrough status to the drug in 2016.
- NI-1401, an anti-IL17 drug being developed in partnership with Genentech for inflammatory and auto-immune diseases.
- NI-1701, an anti-CD47, anti-CD19 bispecific antibody in development for treatment of B-cell hematological cancers.
- NI-1801, an anti-CD47, anti-mesothelin bispecific antibody in the preclinical phase of development for treatment of solid tumors.

No drugs have been approved yet.
