= Voxelotor =

Medication

Clinical data
- Trade names: Oxbryta
- Other names: GBT440, GBT-440
- AHFS/Drugs.com: Monograph
- MedlinePlus: a620011
- License data: US DailyMed: Voxelotor
- Routes of administration: By mouth
- ATC code: B06AX03 (WHO)

Legal status
- Legal status: US: ℞-only; EU: Rx-only

Identifiers
- IUPAC name: 2-Hydroxy-6-{[2-(1-isopropyl-1H-pyrazol-5-yl)-3-pyridinyl]methoxy}benzaldehyde
- CAS Number: 1446321-46-5
- PubChem CID: 71602803
- DrugBank: DB14975
- ChemSpider: 37999268
- UNII: 3ZO554A4Q8
- KEGG: D11330
- ChEMBL: ChEMBL4101807
- CompTox Dashboard (EPA): DTXSID801027954

Chemical and physical data
- Formula: C_{19}H_{19}N_{3}O_{3}
- Molar mass: 337.379 g·mol^{−1}
- 3D model (JSmol): Interactive image
- SMILES: CC(C)N1C(=CC=N1)C2=C(C=CC=N2)COC3=CC=CC(=C3C=O)O
- InChI: InChI=1S/C19H19N3O3/c1-13(2)22-16(8-10-21-22)19-14(5-4-9-20-19)12-25-18-7-3-6-17(24)15(18)11-23/h3-11,13,24H,12H2,1-2H3; Key:FWCVZAQENIZVMY-UHFFFAOYSA-N

Voxelotor, sold under the brand name Oxbryta, is a medication used for the treatment of sickle cell disease. Voxelotor is the first hemoglobin oxygen-affinity modulator. Voxelotor has been shown to have disease-modifying potential by increasing hemoglobin levels and decreasing hemolysis indicators in sickle cell patients. It initially appeared to have an acceptable safety profile in sickle cell patients and healthy volunteers, without any dose-limiting toxicity noted in clinical trials. It was developed by Global Blood Therapeutics, a subsidiary of Pfizer.

In November 2019, voxelotor received accelerated approval in the United States for the treatment of sickle cell disease for those aged twelve years of age and older. The US Food and Drug Administration considers it to be a first-in-class medication. In December 2021, voxelotor received accelerated approval in the United States for the treatment of sickle cell disease for those aged four to eleven years.

In September 2024, Pfizer announced a voluntary withdrawal of voxelotor from all global markets due to concerns regarding the potential for severe safety events, including fatalities.

== Side effects ==
Common side effects include headache, diarrhea, abdominal pain, nausea, fatigue, rash and pyrexia (fever).

== History ==
Voxelotor was granted accelerated approval by the US Food and Drug Administration (FDA) in November 2019. The FDA granted the application for voxelotor fast track designation and orphan drug designation.

The approval of voxelotor was based on the results of a clinical trial with 274 participants with sickle cell disease. The FDA granted the approval of Oxbryta to Global Blood Therapeutics.

== Society and culture ==
=== Legal status ===
In December 2021, the Committee for Medicinal Products for Human Use (CHMP) of the European Medicines Agency (EMA) adopted a positive opinion, recommending the granting of a marketing authorization for the medicinal product Oxbryta, intended for the treatment of hemolytic anemia due to sickle cell disease. The applicant for this medicinal product is Global Blood Therapeutics Netherlands B.V. Voxelotor (Oxbryta) was approved for medical use in the European Union in February 2022.

In September 2024, the CHMP recommended suspending the marketing authorization for voxelotor (Oxbryta). The CHMP described this recommendation as a precaution while a review of additional clinical trial data was proceeding. The CHMP review of clinical trial data began in July 2024, following concerns in two ongoing placebo-controlled clinical trials that raised the possibility that the drug's benefit risk ratio was no longer favorable, due to possibly related excess deaths. The CHMP also cited observational studies which found a higher rate of painful vaso-occlusive crises during treatment with voxelotor than the subjects had before starting the medicine. In October 2025, the CHMP recommended that the marketing authorization of the sickle cell disease medicine Oxbryta remain suspended. Following its assessment, the CHMP concluded that the benefits of the medicine no longer outweigh its risks. The review was started after data showed a higher number of deaths with Oxbryta than with placebo (a dummy treatment) in one clinical trial and a higher-than-anticipated number of deaths in another trial.

In September 2024, Pfizer announced a voluntary withdrawal of voxelotor from all global markets due to concerns regarding the potential for severe safety events, including fatalities.
