= Taletrectinib =

Medication

Clinical data
- Trade names: Ibtrozi
- AHFS/Drugs.com: Monograph
- MedlinePlus: a625089
- License data: US DailyMed: Taletrectinib
- Routes of administration: By mouth
- Drug class: Antineoplastic
- ATC code: None

Legal status
- Legal status: US: ℞-only

Identifiers
- IUPAC name: 3-(4-((R)-2-aminopropoxy)phenyl)-N-((R)-1-(3-fluorophenyl)ethyl)imidazo[1,2-b]pyridazin-6-amine
- CAS Number: 1505514-27-1; as salt: 1505515-69-4
- PubChem CID: 72202474; as salt: 72694302
- DrugBank: DB18711
- ChemSpider: 114934673; as salt: 88297530
- UNII: W4141180YD; as salt: 6KLL51GNBG
- KEGG: D12363; as salt: D12364
- ChEMBL: ChEMBL4650989; as salt: ChEMBL4650361

Chemical and physical data
- Formula: C_{23}H_{24}FN_{5}O
- Molar mass: 405.477 g·mol^{−1}
- 3D model (JSmol): Interactive image
- SMILES: C[C@@H](N)COc1ccc(-c2cnc3ccc(N[C@H](C)c4cccc(F)c4)nn23)cc1
- InChI: InChI=1S/C23H24FN5O/c1-15(25)14-30-20-8-6-17(7-9-20)21-13-26-23-11-10-22(28-29(21)23)27-16(2)18-4-3-5-19(24)12-18/h3-13,15-16H,14,25H2,1-2H3,(H,27,28)/t15-,16-/m1/s1; Key:HEVHTYMYEMEBPX-HZPDHXFCSA-N; as salt: InChI=1S/C23H24FN5O.C6H10O4/c1-15(25)14-30-20-8-6-17(7-9-20)21-13-26-23-11-10-22(28-29(21)23)27-16(2)18-4-3-5-19(24)12-18;7-5(8)3-1-2-4-6(9)10/h3-13,15-16H,14,25H2,1-2H3,(H,27,28);1-4H2,(H,7,8)(H,9,10)/t15-,16-;/m1./s1; Key:DORJQZDOULKINH-QNBGGDODSA-N

Taletrectinib, sold under the brand name Ibtrozi, is an anti-cancer medication used for the treatment of non-small cell lung cancer. It is used as the salt, taletrectinib adipate. Taletrectinib is a kinase inhibitor. It is taken by mouth.

Taletrectinib was approved for medical use in the United States in June 2025.

== Medical uses ==
Taletrectinib is indicated for the treatment of adults with locally advanced or metastatic ROS1-positive non-small cell lung cancer.

== Adverse effects ==
The US Food and Drug Administration (FDA) prescribing information for taletrectinib includes warnings and precautions for hepatotoxicity, interstitial lung disease/pneumonitis, QTc interval prolongation, hyperuricemia, myalgia with creatine phosphokinase elevation, skeletal fractures, and embryo-fetal toxicity.

== History ==
The US Food and Drug Administration (FDA) approved taletrectinib based on evidence from 270 participants with ROS1-positive NSCLC that had spread beyond the lungs who received taletrectinib 600 mg orally once daily, enrolled in two clinical trials: TRUST-I (NCT04395677) or TRUST-II (NCT04919811). The TRUST-I trial was conducted exclusively in China and the TRUST-II trial was conducted globally in North America (United States and Canada), Europe (France, Italy, Spain, and Poland), and Asia (China, Japan, and South Korea).

The efficacy of taletrectinib to treat ROS1-positive non-small cell lung cancer was evaluated in participants with locally advanced or metastatic, ROS1-positive non-small cell lung cancer enrolled in two multi-center, single-arm, open-label clinical trials, TRUST-I (NCT04395677) and TRUST-II (NCT04919811). The efficacy population included 157 participants (103 in TRUST-I; 54 in TRUST-II) who were naïve to treatment with a ROS1 tyrosine kinase inhibitor (TKI) and 113 participants (66 in TRUST-I; 47 in TRUST-II) who had received one prior ROS1 tyrosine kinase inhibitor. Participants may have received prior chemotherapy for advanced disease.

The safety of taletrectinib was evaluated in 352 participants (337 with non-small cell lung cancer and 15 with other solid tumors) who received at least one 600 mg dose of taletrectinib. In the 337 participants with non-small cell lung cancer, the median age was 56 years (range: 26 to 83); 56% female; 76% Asian, 15% White, 0.6% Black or African American, 8% unknown or other races; and 1.8% were of Hispanic or Latino ethnicity. The number of participants representing efficacy findings differs from the number of participants representing safety findings due to different groups of study participants analyzed for efficacy and safety.

The FDA granted the application for taletrectinib priority review, breakthrough therapy, and orphan drug designations.

== Society and culture ==
=== Legal status ===
Taletrectinib was approved for medical use in the United States in June 2025.

=== Names ===
Taletrectinib is the international nonproprietary name.

Taletrectinib is sold under the brand name Ibtrozi.
