= Nerandomilast =

Medication

Clinical data
- Trade names: Jascayd
- Other names: BI-1015550, BI 1015550
- AHFS/Drugs.com: Monograph
- MedlinePlus: a625107
- License data: US DailyMed: Nerandomilast
- Routes of administration: By mouth
- Drug class: Phosphodiesterase-4 inhibitor
- ATC code: L04AA61 (WHO)

Legal status
- Legal status: US: ℞-only; EU: Rx-only; CN: Rx-only

Identifiers
- IUPAC name: (5R)-2-[4-(5-chloropyrimidin-2-yl)piperidin-1-yl]-4-{[1-(hydroxymethyl)cyclobutyl]amino}-6,7-dihydro-5H-5λ⁴-thieno[3,2-d]pyrimidin-5-one
- CAS Number: 1423719-30-5
- PubChem CID: 166177189
- DrugBank: DB18237
- ChemSpider: 129160248
- UNII: I5DGT51IB8
- KEGG: D12975

Chemical and physical data
- Formula: C_{20}H_{25}ClN_{6}O_{2}S
- Molar mass: 448.97 g·mol^{−1}
- 3D model (JSmol): Interactive image
- SMILES: C1CC(C1)(CO)NC2=NC(=NC3=C2[S@](=O)CC3)N4CCC(CC4)C5=NC=C(C=N5)Cl
- InChI: InChI=1S/C20H25ClN6O2S/c21-14-10-22-17(23-11-14)13-2-7-27(8-3-13)19-24-15-4-9-30(29)16(15)18(25-19)26-20(12-28)5-1-6-20/h10-11,13,28H,1-9,12H2,(H,24,25,26)/t30-/m1/s1; Key:UHYCLWAANUGUMN-SSEXGKCCSA-N

Nerandomilast, sold under the brand name Jascayd, is a medication used for the treatment of idiopathic pulmonary fibrosis and progressive pulmonary fibrosis. It is a phosphodiesterase 4 (PDE4) inhibitor. It is taken by mouth.

Common side effects include diarrhea, decreased weight, decreased appetite, and nausea.

Nerandomilast was approved for medical use in the United States in October 2025. The US Food and Drug Administration considers it to be a first-in-class medication.

== Medical uses ==
Nerandomilast is indicated for the treatment of idiopathic pulmonary fibrosis and for the treatment of progressive pulmonary fibrosis.

Idiopathic pulmonary fibrosis affects the tissue surrounding the air sacs, or alveoli, in the lungs. It develops when this lung tissue becomes thick and stiff. Over time, these changes can cause permanent lung scarring (fibrosis) that makes it more difficult to breathe.

Progressive pulmonary fibrosis is a chronic disease characterized by gradual, irreversible scarring of the lungs, which can lead to progressive breathing difficulties. Progressive pulmonary fibrosis is an umbrella term that can describe progressive lung scarring in many interstitial lung diseases.

== Side effects ==
Side effects include diarrhea, decreased weight, decreased appetite, and nausea.

== History ==
The efficacy of nerandomilast for the treatment of idiopathic pulmonary fibrosis was evaluated in two randomized, double-blind, placebo-controlled trials of adults with idiopathic pulmonary fibrosis.

The efficacy of nerandomilast for the treatment of progressive pulmonary fibrosis was demonstrated in FIBRONEER-ILD (NCT05321082), a randomized, double-blind, placebo-controlled study that enrolled 1,178 adults with progressive pulmonary fibrosis. Participants were randomly assigned 1:1:1 to receive twice daily administration of nerandomilast 9 mg, nerandomilast 18 mg, or placebo, for at least 52 weeks.

In July 2026, a phase III trial called VERANDA-SSc (NCT07497087) began testing nerandomilast in adults with systemic sclerosis. Its primary outcome is the time to disease progression or death.

== Society and culture ==
=== Legal status ===
Nerandomilast was approved for medical use in the United States in October 2025.

The US Food and Drug Administration granted the application for nerandomilast an orphan drug designation for the idiopathic pulmonary fibrosis indication and breakthrough therapy designation for the progressive pulmonary fibrosis indication.

In May 2026, the Committee for Medicinal Products for Human Use of the European Medicines Agency adopted a positive opinion, recommending the granting of a marketing authorization for the medicinal product Jascayd, intended for the treatment of adults with idiopathic pulmonary fibrosis or adults with progressive pulmonary fibrosis. The applicant for this medicinal product is Boehringer Ingelheim International GmbH. Nerandomilast was authorized for medical use in the European Union in July 2026.

=== Names ===
Nerandomilast is the international nonproprietary name.

Nerandomilast is sold under the brand name Jascayd.
