= MYCO-006 =

Clinical data
- Other names: MYCO006
- Drug class: Entactogen; Empathogen

MYCO-006 is an MDMA-like entactogen that is under development for the treatment of psychiatric disorders. It is a short-acting and fast-onset MDMA analogue. Based on animal studies, it is predicted that MYCO-006 will have a duration of 1 to 2 hours, about one-third the 6- to 8-hour duration of MDMA, and to onset 4 times as fast as MDMA. MYCO-006 is being developed by Mydecine. As of February 2024, it is in preclinical research. The chemical structure of MYCO-006 does not yet appear to have been disclosed. 5-BZT-MDMA and 6-BZT-MDMA were described in Mydecine's patent for short-acting MDMA analogues.

== See also ==
- MYCO-002
- MYCO-007
- List of investigational hallucinogens and entactogens
