= Asandeutertinib =

Clinical data
- Other names: Runnor-9591, TY 9591

Identifiers
- IUPAC name: N-[2-[2-(dimethylamino)ethyl-methylamino]-4-methoxy-5-[[4-[1-(trideuteriomethyl)indol-3-yl]pyrimidin-2-yl]amino]phenyl]prop-2-enamide
- CAS Number: 1638281-46-5
- PubChem CID: 87056175
- IUPHAR/BPS: 13201
- ChemSpider: 129431787
- UNII: 9EKD2E8BM5

Chemical and physical data
- Formula: C_{28}H_{30}D_{3}N_{7}O_{2}
- Molar mass: 502.636 g·mol^{−1}
- 3D model (JSmol): Interactive image
- SMILES: [2H]C([2H])([2H])N1C=C(C2=CC=CC=C21)C3=NC(=NC=C3)NC4=C(C=C(C(=C4)NC(=O)C=C)N(C)CCN(C)C)OC
- InChI: InChI=InChI=1S/C28H33N7O2/c1-7-27(36)30-22-16-23(26(37-6)17-25(22)34(4)15-14-33(2)3)32-28-29-13-12-21(31-28)20-18-35(5)24-11-9-8-10-19(20)24/h7-13,16-18H,1,14-15H2,2-6H3,(H,30,36)(H,29,31,32)/i5D3; Key:DUYJMQONPNNFPI-VPYROQPTSA-N

Asandeutertinib is an investigational new drug that is being evaluated for the treatment of cancer. It is an epidermal growth factor receptor (EGFR) tyrosine kinase inhibitor (TKI) with antineoplastic properties. Developed by TYK Medicines, this small molecule drug is currently being investigated for the treatment of non-small cell lung cancer (NSCLC), particularly in patients with EGFR mutations.

It is a deuterated derivative of osimertinib, in which three hydrogen atoms are replaced by deuterium.
