= Ceritinib =

ALK inhibitor for treatment of non-small-cell lung cancer

Clinical data
- Pronunciation: /səˈrɪtɪnɪb/ sə-RIT-i-nib
- Trade names: Zykadia, others
- Other names: LDK378
- AHFS/Drugs.com: Monograph
- MedlinePlus: a614027
- License data: US DailyMed: Ceritinib
- Routes of administration: By mouth
- ATC code: L01ED02 (WHO)

Legal status
- Legal status: AU: S4 (Prescription only); CA: ℞-only; US: ℞-only; EU: Rx-only

Pharmacokinetic data
- Bioavailability: Not determined
- Protein binding: 97%
- Metabolism: CYP3A
- Elimination half-life: 41 hours
- Excretion: Feces (92.3%), urine (1.3%)

Identifiers
- IUPAC name: 5-Chloro-N^{2}-{5-methyl-4-(piperidin-4-yl)-2-[(propan-2-yl)oxy]phenyl}-N^{4}-[2-(propane-2-sulfonyl)phenyl]pyrimidine-2,4-diamine
- CAS Number: 1032900-25-6
- PubChem CID: 57379345
- DrugBank: DB09063
- ChemSpider: 29315053
- UNII: K418KG2GET
- KEGG: D10551
- ChEBI: CHEBI:78432
- ChEMBL: ChEMBL2403108
- PDB ligand: 4MK (PDBe, RCSB PDB)
- CompTox Dashboard (EPA): DTXSID10725373
- ECHA InfoCard: 100.241.919

Chemical and physical data
- Formula: C_{28}H_{36}ClN_{5}O_{3}S
- Molar mass: 558.14 g·mol^{−1}
- 3D model (JSmol): Interactive image
- SMILES: CC1=CC(=C(C=C1C2CCNCC2)OC(C)C)NC3=NC=C(C(=N3)NC4=CC=CC=C4S(=O)(=O)C(C)C)Cl
- InChI: InChI=1S/C28H36ClN5O3S/c1-17(2)37-25-15-21(20-10-12-30-13-11-20)19(5)14-24(25)33-28-31-16-22(29)27(34-28)32-23-8-6-7-9-26(23)38(35,36)18(3)4/h6-9,14-18,20,30H,10-13H2,1-5H3,(H2,31,32,33,34); Key:VERWOWGGCGHDQE-UHFFFAOYSA-N

Ceritinib (INN, trade name Zykadia /zaɪˈkeɪdiːə/ zy-KAY-dee-ə) is a prescription-only drug used for the treatment of non-small cell lung cancer (NSCLC). It was developed by Novartis and received FDA approval for use in April 2014.

== Medical uses ==
Ceritinib is an anaplastic lymphoma kinase (ALK) inhibitor primarily used for the treatment of ALK positive metastatic NSCLC. Previously, it was only indicated for patients who had developed resistant to crizotinib, another ALK inhibitor, but has since had its usage expanded to serve as a primary option for metastatic NSCLC.

== Adverse effects ==
Serious adverse effects include gastrointestinal toxicity, hepatotoxicity, interstitial lung disease, prolonged QT syndrome, hyperglycemia, bradycardia, and pancreatitis.

The most commonly reported side effects were diarrhea, nausea, elevated liver enzymes, vomiting, abdominal pain, fatigue, decreased appetite, and constipation.

== Interactions ==
Ceritinib is both a substrate and potent inhibitor of the enzyme CYP3A4, so medications that have affinity for this enzyme may interact with ceritinib.

== Pharmacology ==
=== Mechanism of action ===
Ceritinib is a tyrosine kinase inhibitor that selectively and potently inhibits anaplastic lymphoma kinase (ALK). In normal physiology, ALK functions as a key step in the development and function of nervous system tissue. However, chromosomal translocation and fusion give rise to an oncogenic form of ALK that has been implicated in progression of NSCLC. Ceritinib thus acts to inhibit this mutated enzyme and stop cell proliferation, ultimately halting cancer progression. Because ceritinib is considered a targeted cancer therapy, an FDA-approved test is required to determine which patients are candidates for ceritinib. This test, developed by Roche, is the VENTANA ALK (D5F3) CDx Assay and is used to identify ALK-positive NSCLC patients who would benefit from ceritinib treatment.

== Research and development ==
Researchers first identified the ALK fusion gene in 1994. Several years later, Novartis Pharmaceuticals Corporation, began working towards development of targeted ALK inhibitors. In April 2014, the FDA granted accelerated approval for ceritinib when used for ALK-positive NSCLC patients who have progressed on or are intolerant to crizotinib (Xalkori, Pfizer, Inc.). This rapid approval was determined from a multi-center clinical trial in which 163 patients who had disease progression or were intolerant to crizotinib received oral ceritinib 750 mg once daily. This trial demonstrated an objective response rate (ORR) of 44% and a median duration of response (DOR) of 7.1 months, both of which were favorable compared to the worsening or failed use of crizotinib.

In February 2017, the FDA accepted a supplement New Drug Application for ceritinib and granted Priority Review for expanded use of ceritinib. Specifically, it became a first-line therapy option for metastatic NSCLC with ALK-positive tumors. Additionally, the FDA also gave Breakthrough Therapy designation to the drug for ALK-positive metastatic NSCLC that has metastasized to the brain. This new designation resulted from the ASCEND-4 clinical trial, which was a randomized, phase III study that compared the use of ceritinib to standard-of-care platinum-based chemotherapy treatments. Median progression-free survival was 16.6 months for ceritinib (n=189) versus 8.1 months in the chemotherapy-treated patients (n=187).

== Society and culture ==
=== Economics ===
Zykadia is manufactured by Novartis. Created in 1996 from a merger between Ciba-Geigy and Sandoz, Novartis is a global corporation based out of Basel, Switzerland. Over 155 countries worldwide have Novartis products available for use. Financial data from 2016 reveals net sales of $48.5 billion for the Swiss company.

Novartis divides its shares into two major market exchanges: the ordinary shares (NOVN SW) trade in the Six Swiss Exchange while the American Depositary Receipts (NVS US) trade in the New York Stock Exchange. Nominees, fiduciaries, and ADR depositary make up the bulk of registered shareholders of Novartis stock while individual shareholders make up the lowest percentage.

Originally launched in 2014, Zykadia sales for Fiscal Year 2016 reached $91 million. While this is substantially less than several of their other pharmaceuticals, the new indication introduced in 2017 should result in increased sales of the drug. GlobalData predicts ceritinib sales to exceed $127million by 2025, while sustaining a compounded annual growth rate of 10.7%.

=== Intellectual property ===
Novartis currently owns twelve patents on Zykadia. The patents relate to different structures of the chemical compound as well as methodologies for manufacturing the drug. For example, one patent examines the structure of pyrimidines and their use in treatment of neoplastic diseases. Others examine the composition of protein kinase inhibitors. The most recent patents are specific the methodologies of using ALK inhibitors.

=== Brand names ===
Ceritinib is also sold under the brand name Spexib in some countries by Novartis.
