= Fast track (FDA) =

US FDA designation for investigational drugs

Fast track is a designation by the United States Food and Drug Administration (FDA) of an investigational drug for expedited review to facilitate development of drugs that treat a serious or life-threatening condition and fill an unmet medical need. Fast track designation must be requested by the drug company. The request can be initiated at any time during the drug development process. FDA will review the request and attempt to make a decision within sixty days.

== Purpose ==
Fast track is one of five FDA approaches to make new drugs available as rapidly as possible: the others are priority review, breakthrough therapy, accelerated approval and regenerative medicine advanced therapy.

Fast track was introduced by the FDA Modernization Act of 1997.

== Requirements ==
Fast track designation is designed to aid in the development and expedite the review of drugs which show promise in treating a serious or life-threatening disease and address an unmet medical need.

Serious condition: determining whether a disease is serious is a matter of judgment, but generally is based on whether the drug will affect such factors as survival, day-to-day functioning, or the likelihood that the disease, if left untreated, will progress from a less severe condition to a more serious one.

Unmet medical need: for a drug to address an unmet medical need, the drug may be developed as a treatment or preventative measure for a disease that does not have a current therapy. The type of information necessary to demonstrate unmet medical need varies with the stage of drug development: early in development, nonclinical data, mechanistic rationale, or pharmacologic data will suffice; later in development, clinical data should be utilized. If there are existing therapies, a fast track eligible drug must show some advantage over available treatment, such as:

- Showing superior effectiveness
- Avoiding serious side effects of an available treatment
- Improving the diagnosis of a serious disease where early diagnosis results in an improved outcome
- Decreasing a clinically significant toxicity of an available treatment
- Addressing an expected public health need.

== Incentives ==
A drug that receives a fast track designation is eligible for some or all of the following:

- More frequent meetings with FDA to discuss the drug's development plan and ensure collection of appropriate data needed to support drug approval
- More frequent written correspondence from FDA about such things as the design of the proposed clinical trials
- Accelerated approval or priority review if the requisite criteria are met. Accelerated approval is meant for drugs that demonstrate an effect on a surrogate, or intermediate endpoint reasonably likely to predict clinical benefit. Priority review shortens the FDA review process for a new drug from ten months to six months, and is appropriate for drugs that demonstrate significant improvements in both safety and effectiveness of an existing therapy. A fast track application is automatically considered for both of these designations.
- Rolling review, which means that a drug company can submit completed sections of its New Drug Application (NDA) for review by FDA, rather than waiting until every section of the application is completed before the entire application can be reviewed. NDA review usually does not begin until the drug company has submitted the entire application to the FDA

An FDA decision not to grant fast track status, or any other general dispute, may be appealed to the division responsible for reviewing the application within the Center for Drug Evaluation and Research. The drug sponsor can subsequently utilize the Agency's procedures for internal review or dispute resolution if necessary.

Once a drug receives fast track designation, early and frequent communication between the FDA and a drug company is encouraged throughout the entire drug development and review process. The frequency of communication assures that questions and issues are resolved quickly, often leading to earlier drug approval and access by patients.

== See also ==
- Orphan drug, a similar FDA designation
