= Priority review =

US Food and Drug Administration drug review program

Priority review is a designation granted by the U.S. Food and Drug Administration (FDA) to certain drug applications that, if approved, would provide significant improvements in the treatment, diagnosis, or prevention of serious conditions. Under this designation, the FDA aims to take action on an application within six months, compared to ten months under standard review.

Priority review does not change the standards for approval or the amount of evidence required to demonstrate a drug's safety and effectiveness. Instead, it allows the FDA to allocate additional resources to the evaluation of promising therapies. The designation is one of several expedited programs used by the FDA to facilitate the development and review of drugs that address unmet medical needs.

Priority review is a program of the United States Food and Drug Administration (FDA) to expedite the review process for drugs that are expected to have a particularly great impact on the treatment of a disease. The priority review voucher program is a program that grants a voucher for priority review to a drug developer as an incentive to develop treatments for disease indications with limited profitability.

Priority review vouchers are currently earned by pharmaceutical companies for the development and approval of drugs treating neglected tropical diseases, rare pediatric diseases, and "medical countermeasures" for terrorism. The voucher can be used for future drugs that could have wider indications for use, but the company is required to pay a fee (approximately $2.8 million) to use the voucher.

When seeking approval for a drug, manufacturers can apply to the FDA for priority review. This is granted when a drug is intended to treat a serious condition and would "provide a significant improvement in safety or effectiveness" over currently available treatments. A priority review voucher can be used when a drug does not fit these requirements, but the company wishes to expedite the review process.

In 2007, Title XI of the Food and Drug Administration Amendments Act of 2007 created the priority review voucher program for neglected tropical diseases. This was extended in 2012 by the Food and Drug Administration Safety and Innovation Act to include rare pediatric diseases. The act built upon the tropical disease system and made amendments including a shorter notification to the FDA before exercising a voucher, a designation system so that early in the drug development cycle sponsors may use the possibility of earning a voucher in their valuation of their company, a requirement of a marketing plan and reporting of marketing, and indefinite transferability of the voucher. In 2016, medical countermeasures were added to the program.

== Priority review ==
Prior to approval, each drug marketed in the United States must go through a detailed FDA review process. In 1992, under the Prescription Drug User Fee Act (PDUFA), FDA agreed to specific goals for improving the drug review time and created a two-tiered system of review times – standard review and priority review.

A priority review designation is given to drugs that offer major advances in treatment, or provide a treatment where no adequate therapy exists. The 2002 amendments to PDUFA set a goal that a standard review of a new drug application be accomplished within a ten-month time frame. The FDA goal for completing a priority review is six months. Priority review status can apply both to drugs that are used to treat serious diseases and to drugs for less serious illnesses.

The distinction between priority and standard review times is that additional FDA attention and resources will be directed to drugs that have the potential to provide significant advances in treatment. Such advances can be demonstrated by, for example: evidence of increased effectiveness in treatment, prevention, or diagnosis of disease; elimination or substantial reduction of a treatment-limiting drug reaction; documented enhancement of patient willingness or ability to take the drug according to the required schedule and dose; or evidence of safety and effectiveness in a new subpopulation, such as children.

A request for Priority Review must be made by the drug company. It does not affect the length of the clinical trial period. FDA determines within 45 days of the drug company's request whether a priority or standard review designation will be assigned. Designation of a drug as "priority" does not alter the scientific/medical standard for approval or the quality of evidence necessary. Safety requirements for a priority review are equal to that of a standard review.

The amendment can be found on page 150 of the Food and Drug Administration Amendments Act of 2007.

== Priority review voucher program ==
The statute authorizes the FDA to award a priority review voucher to the sponsor (manufacturer) of a newly approved drug or biologic that targets a neglected tropical disease or a rare pediatric disease. The provision applies to New Drug Applications (NDAs), Biological License Applications (BLAs) and 505(b)(2) applications. The voucher, which is transferable and can be sold, entitles the bearer to a priority review for another product.

Under current Prescription Drug User Fee Act targets, the FDA aims to complete and act upon reviews of priority drugs within six months instead of the standard ten-month review period. Actual FDA review timelines, however, can be longer than the target PDUFA review periods, particularly for new products that haven't previously been approved for any indications. Economists at Duke University, who published on this concept in 2006, estimated that priority review can cut the FDA review process from an average of 18 months down to six months, shortening by as much as a full year the time it takes for the company's drug to reach the market.

An intangible benefit of the voucher is the value created for a company if the faster review provides them "first mover advantage," allowing the voucher holder's product to be introduced ahead of a similar, competing product. By taking advantage of existing market forces, patients in the developing world can have faster access to lifesaving products that may not otherwise be developed. And sponsors of neglected disease drugs can be rewarded for their innovations

Sponsors must inform the FDA of their intention to use a priority review voucher 90 days before submission. Before adding Ebola to the FDA Priority Review Voucher Program Act in 2014, this requirement was 365 days, which was a hindrance to the process of speedy review, as companies do not typically determine when drugs will be submitted until the results of safety studies are available.

Companies may also sell vouchers to other drug companies. Thus far, priority review vouchers have sold for $50–350 million.

=== Cost ===
Companies that use the voucher will be required to pay a supplemental priority review user fee to ensure that the FDA can recoup the costs incurred by the agency for the faster review, in addition to the fee for standard review of drugs. The additional user fee also aims to ensure that the new program will not slow the progress of other products awaiting FDA review. The cost has decreased dramatically from over $5 million in 2012. For the fiscal year 2018, this fee is $2.8 million.

=== Uses of the priority review program ===
As of 2017, fourteen priority review vouchers have been awarded, four for tropical diseases, and ten for rare pediatric diseases. The first priority review voucher was awarded in 2009 to Novartis for its approval of Coartem. The next voucher was not awarded until 2012.

Vouchers have been awarded for the following:
Program	Drug	Indication	Company	Year
Tropical disease	Coartem	Malaria	Novartis	
Tropical disease	Sirturo	Multi-drug-resistant tuberculosis	Janssen Pharmaceutica	
Rare pediatric disease	Vimizim	Morquio syndrome	BioMarin Pharmaceutical	
Tropical disease	Impavido	Leishmaniasis	Knight Therapeutics	
Rare pediatric	Unituxin	Neuroblastoma	United Therapeutics	
Rare pediatric	Cholbam	Zellweger syndrome	Asklepion Pharmaceuticals	
Rare pediatric	Xuriden	Orotic aciduria	Wellstat Therapeutics	
Rare pediatric	Strensiq	Hypophosphatasia	Alexion Pharmaceuticals	
Rare pediatric	Kanuma	Lysosomal acid lipase deficiency	Alexion	
Tropical disease	Vaxchora	Cholera prevention	PaxVax	
Rare pediatric	Exondys 51	Duchenne muscular dystrophy	Sarepta Therapeutics	
Rare pediatric	Spinraza	Spinal muscular atrophy	Ionis Pharmaceuticals	
Rare pediatric	Emflaza	Duchenne muscular dystrophy	Marathon Pharmaceuticals	
Rare pediatric	Brineura	Batten disease	BioMarin Pharmaceutical	
Tropical disease	benznidazole	Chagas disease	ChemoResearch	
Rare pediatric	Kymriah	B-ALL	Novartis	
Rare pediatric	Mepsevii	Mucopolysaccharidosis type VII	Ultragenyx	
Rare pediatric	Luxturna	RPE65-mutated retinal dystrophy	Spark Therapeutics	
Rare pediatric	Crysvita	X-linked hypophosphatemia	Ultragenyx	2020
Tropical disease	Moxidectin	Onchocerciasis	Medicines Development for Global Health	
Rare pediatric	Epidiolex	Lennox–Gastaut syndrome	GW Pharmaceuticals	
Material threat countermeasure	Tpoxx	Smallpox	SIGA Technologies	
Tropical disease	Krintafel	Malaria	GlaxoSmithKline	
Rare pediatric	Revcovi	Adenosine deaminase-SCID	Leadiant Biosciences	
Rare pediatric	Gamifant	Haemophagocytic lymphohistiocytosis	Novimmune	
Tropical disease	Egaten	Fascioliasis	Novartis	
Rare pediatric	Symdeko	F508del cystic fibrosis	Vertex Pharmaceuticals	
Tropical disease	Dengvaxia	Dengue	Sanofi	
Rare pediatric	Zolgensma	Spinal muscular atrophy	AveXis	
Tropical disease	Pretomanid	Tuberculosis	TB Alliance	
Material threat countermeasure	Jynneos	Smallpox	Bavarian Nordic	
Rare pediatric	Trikafta	Cystic fibrosis	Vertex Pharmaceuticals	
Tropical disease	Ervebo	Ebola	Merck & Co.	
	Capmatinib	MET exon 14 skipping mutated non-small cell lung cancer	Novartis	
	KTE-X19	Mantle cell lymphoma	Kite Pharma	
	Selpercatinib	RET fusion-positive non-small cell lung cancer	Eli Lilly	
	elantamab mafodotin	Multiple myeloma	GlaxoSmithKline	
	Cedazuridine and decitabine	Chronic myelomonocytic leukemia	Astex Pharmaceuticals	
Rare pediatric	Vyondys 53	Duchenne muscular dystrophy	Sarepta Therapeutics	2020
Rare pediatric	Oxlumo	Primary hyperoxaluria type 1	Alnylam Pharmaceuticals	2020
Rare pediatric	Rethymic	Congenital athymia	Enzyvant Therapeutics	2021

== Extensions ==
=== Extension to rare pediatric diseases ===
In 2012, President Obama signed into law the FDA Safety and Innovation Act which includes Section 908, the "Rare Pediatric Disease Priority Review Voucher Incentive Program". Section 529 extends the voucher program to rare pediatric diseases, but only on a trial basis. After the third voucher is awarded, the Comptroller General of the United States is to conduct a study on the effectiveness of the pediatric priority review voucher program.

The pediatric voucher program includes changes to the voucher program. First, the pediatric treatment developer can ask the FDA in advance for an indication of whether the disease qualifies as a rare, pediatric disease.

The awardee must market the drug within 365 days of approval, or the voucher may be revoked. Within five years of approval, the manufacturer must submit a report containing information on the estimated population in the United States suffering from the rare pediatric disease, the estimated demand in the United States for such rare pediatric disease product, and the actual amount of such rare pediatric disease product distributed in the United States.

The Advancing Hope Act of 2016 reauthorized the program until December 31, 2016 and instructed the GAO to compile a report on the effectiveness of the program.

In February 2026, the FDA announced that the priority review voucher program for rare pediatric diseases would end in September 2029.

=== Extension to ebola virus ===
In December 2014, the Senate approved a bill that would add the Ebola virus to the Priority Review Voucher List. The bill, S. 2917—Adding Ebola to the FDA Priority Review Voucher Program Act, was introduced by Senator Tom Harkin on November 12, 2014. President Obama signed it on December 16, and it became Public Law 113-233. Forty-five Senators cosponsored the bill (26 Democrats and 19 Republicans). This act also eliminated the differences between tropical disease and pediatric disease vouchers, but allowing both to be sold an unlimited number of times and be used after a 90-day notification period to the FDA.

On a technical level, S. 2917 added "Filoviruses" to the priority review list. The Ebola virus is a type of Filovirus. According to the Congressional Budget Office, enactment of the law does not have an effect on the federal budget.

=== Extension for medical countermeasures ===
The Senate's Medical Countermeasure Innovation Act of 2016 proposed adding a new category of drugs to the priority review voucher program. In 2016, it was confirmed that the approval of drugs for medical countermeasures would be eligible to earn a priority review voucher. Medical countermeasures are drugs to "prevent or treat harm from a biological, chemical, radiological or nuclear agent identified as a material threat".

=== Proposed adoption by European Medicines Agency ===
Writing in The Lancet, David Ridley and Alfonso Calles Sánchez proposed extending the voucher to the European Union. The proposed EU voucher would provide priority regulatory review through the European Medicines Agency, as well as accelerated pricing and reimbursement decisions by EU member states. However, the proposal was not included in the 2025 reform of the EU pharmaceutical legislation.

== Secondary market ==
Because Priority Review Vouchers (PRVs) may be sold, a secondary market for the vouchers has emerged, and their value has increased, although the market for the vouchers is limited. Companies use the sale of PRVs to recoup expenses undertaken for drug research and development. A 2015 Wall Street Journal article raised concerns about the sale of these vouchers, given that they "require the FDA to shorten its decision deadline to six months from the standard 10 months—potentially giving companies an extra four months' worth of sales," but also noted that a voucher is not a guarantee of FDA approval for a drug.

In 2014, Regeneron Pharmaceuticals and Sanofi purchased a PRV that BioMarin had won for a recent rare disease drug approval for $67.5 million; the voucher cut four months off the regulatory review time for alirocumab and was part of their strategy to beat Amgen to market with the first approval of a PCSK9 inhibitor. In 2015, Retrophin sold a PRV to Sanofi for around $245 million, and later the same year, United Therapeutics Corp. sold a PRV for a drug for a rare pediatric disease to AbbVie Inc. for $350 million. In 2016–2018, the value of a voucher ranged from $125 million to $200 million, down from its peak in 2015.

== Diseases targeted ==
The eligible tropical diseases include the following:

- Blinding trachoma
- Buruli ulcer
- Chagas disease (added in 2015)
- Cholera
- Chikungunya virus disease (added in 2018 final order)
- Cryptococcal meningitis (added in 2018 final order)
- Dengue/dengue haemorrhagic fever
- Dracunculiasis (guinea-worm disease)
- Fascioliasis
- Filovirus diseases (including Ebola virus disease) (added in 2014 by Pub. L. 113-233, amended by Pub. L. 114-146)
- Human African trypanosomiasis
- Lassa fever (added in 2018 final order)
- Leishmaniasis
- Leprosy
- Lymphatic filariasis
- Malaria
- Neurocysticercosis (added in 2015)
- Onchocerciasis
- Rabies (added in 2018 final order)
- Schistosomiasis
- Soil-transmitted helminthiasis
- Tuberculosis
- Yaws
- Zika virus disease (added in 2016 by Pub. L. 114-146)
- Any other infectious disease for which there is no significant market in developed nations and that disproportionately affects poor and marginalized populations, designated by order of the Secretary.

Pediatric rare diseases are any disease that primarily affects people under the age of 18 and affects 200,000 or fewer people in the United States. Medical countermeasures are drugs to be used "in the event of a public health emergency stemming from a terrorist attack with a biological, chemical, or radiological/nuclear material, a naturally occurring emerging disease, or a natural disaster."

== Limitations ==
Critics have claimed a number of issues with the priority review program. First, the priority review voucher might be too small or too large to encourage drug development. It may be too small because tropical diseases with incredible burdens can be presumed to merit more resources. This is likely not the case for pediatric rare diseases, some drugs are developed for pediatric use through expansion of adult drug research for similar conditions. The priority review voucher might be too large, if it rewards research which would have been done anyway, or research with low value.

The priority review voucher may tax FDA resources. To mitigate this, use of the priority review voucher includes an extra fee paid by manufacturers to the FDA and requires that voucher bearers provide FDA with 90 days' notice before using a voucher.

Critics of the FDA allege that priority review might not be safe. Priority review should not, however, be confused with accelerated approval or fast track designation. Priority review does not omit safety or efficacy studies or require approval within a given time frame. It sets a target of 6 rather than 10 months for FDA review. Nevertheless, a study in 2008 claimed that new molecular entities approved in the two months before the first review deadlines showed a higher rate of postmarketing safety problems than drugs approved at other times. Nardinelli and colleagues (2008) of the FDA, however, wrote that they were not able to replicate the findings and that the findings might be driven by HIV-AIDS therapies. Following the Nardinelli piece, Carpenter acknowledged several errors in their data set and demonstrated errors in the FDA's and Nardinelli's data; Carpenter and colleagues report that the original associations between last-minute approvals and safety problems hold.

There have also been complaints that the priority review voucher encourages innovation, but does not pay for access to existing therapies. Funding from governments or foundations might be needed to purchase treatments for poor people. There is no requirement for sellers of vouchers to reinvest the funds in neglected tropical diseases. Aidan Hollis of the University of Calgary has commented that the proposal does not address "the access problem, but helps to increase incentives through creating distortions in markets in developed countries". This is entirely a separate issue from the promotion of research intended by the priority review program.

== News and reaction ==
According to Bill Gates, whose foundation funded a press conference that helped publicize the 2006 research paper,

"Some of the highest-leverage work that government can do is to set policy and disburse funds in ways that create market incentives for business activity that improves the lives of the poor. Under a law signed by President Bush last year, any drug company that develops a new treatment for a neglected disease like malaria or TB can get priority review from the Food and Drug Administration for another product they've made. If you develop a new drug for malaria, your profitable cholesterol-lowering drug could go on the market a year earlier. This priority review could be worth hundreds of millions of dollars."

— Bill Gates at the World Economic Forum in Davos in 2008.

== See also ==
- FDA Fast Track Development Program
- Breakthrough therapy
