= Breakthrough therapy =

American legal mechanism

Breakthrough therapy is a United States Food and Drug Administration designation that expedites drug development that was created by Congress under Section 902 of the 9 July 2012 Food and Drug Administration Safety and Innovation Act. The FDA's "breakthrough therapy" designation is not intended to imply that a drug is actually a "breakthrough" or that there is high-quality evidence of treatment efficacy for a particular condition; rather, it allows the FDA to grant priority review to drug candidates if preliminary clinical trials indicate that the therapy may offer substantial treatment advantages over existing options for patients with serious or life-threatening diseases. The FDA has other mechanisms for expediting the review and approval process for promising drugs, including fast track designation, accelerated approval, and priority review.

== Requirements ==
A breakthrough therapy designation can be assigned to a drug if "it is a drug which is intended alone or in combination with one or more other drugs to treat a serious or life threatening disease or condition" and if the preliminary clinical evidence indicates that the drug may demonstrate substantial improvement over existing therapies on one or more clinically significant endpoints, such as substantial treatment effects observed early in clinical development."

Requests are reviewed by the Center for Drug Evaluation and Research (CDER) and the Center for Biologics Evaluation and Research (CBER). CDER receives approximately 100 requests per year for breakthrough designation. Historically, about one third were approved. CBER receives 15–30 requests per year. Sponsors must apply for breakthrough status separately for each indication they intend to label the drug for.

Breakthrough designation applications are submitted as an amendment to the IND applications, usually prior to end of Phase II meeting.

== Incentives ==
Drugs that have been granted breakthrough status are given priority review. The FDA works with the sponsor of the drug application to expedite the approval process. This expedited process can include rolling reviews, smaller clinical trials, and alternative trial designs.

== Issues ==
Critics have said that the name is misleading and provides companies that obtain a breakthrough designation for a drug candidate with a marketing advantage that may be undeserved. The FDA acknowledges that the name "breakthrough therapy" may be misleading. It was never meant to imply that these drugs are actually "breakthroughs", and it does not ensure that they will provide clinical benefit, but still critics complain that they are based on preliminary evidence, including changes in surrogate markers such as laboratory measurements, that often don't reflect "meaningful clinical benefit". The FDA guidance states: "Not all products designated as breakthrough therapies ultimately will be shown to have the substantial improvement over available therapies suggested by the preliminary clinical evidence at the time of designation. If the designation is no longer supported by subsequent data, FDA may rescind the designation."

== See also ==
- List of drugs granted breakthrough therapy designation
- FDA Fast Track Development Program
- Priority review (FDA)
- Orphan drug
