= ALK inhibitor =

Class of pharmaceutical drugs

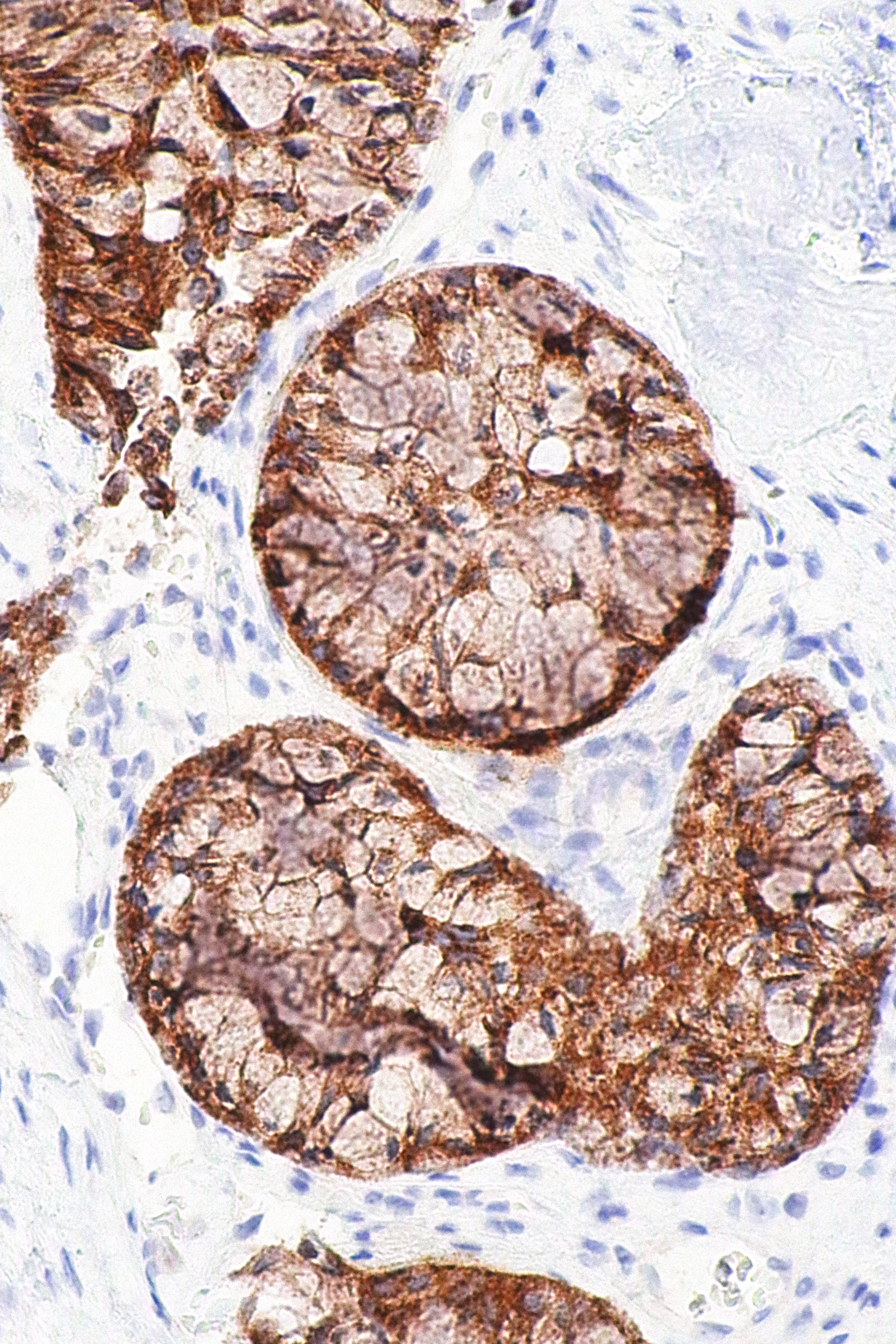
Micrograph showing an ALK positive adenocarcinoma of the lung. The ALK immunostain allows individuals with ALK rearrangements to be identified.

ALK inhibitors are anti-cancer drugs that act on tumours with variations of anaplastic lymphoma kinase (ALK) such as an EML4-ALK translocation. They fall under the category of tyrosine kinase inhibitors, which work by inhibiting proteins involved in the abnormal growth of tumour cells. All the current approved ALK inhibitors function by binding to the ATP pocket of the abnormal ALK protein, blocking its access to energy and deactivating it. A majority of ALK-rearranged NSCLC harbour the EML4-ALK fusion, although as of 2020, over 92 fusion partners have been discovered in ALK+ NSCLC. For each fusion partner, there can be several fusion variants depending on the position the two genes were fused at, and this may have implications on the response of the tumour and prognosis of the patient.

== Approved inhibitors ==
=== First generation ===
Crizotinib (also a ROS1 and c-MET inhibitor) was approved in Aug 2011 by the US FDA for ALK-positive NSCLC. At the time of the discovery of ALK translocations as a molecular driver in NSCLC, crizotinib was being investigated by Pfizer as a potential c-MET inhibitor. Its activity against ALK being known, Pfizer shifted its investigations to focus on this indication, and obtained a full approval 4 years later. Crizotinib's efficacy was proven in phase III trial, PROFILE 1007, when it was compared to then-standard second-line pemetrexed or docetaxel chemotherapy. It induced tumour stabilisation or shrinkage in 90% of patients. Its lack of penetrance in the brain and non-optimal specificity for ALK meant resistance mostly arose within a year, with the brain being a common site of progression. Blockade of ALKAL2 with crizotinib has been shown to produce analgesic effects in animal models.

=== Second generation ===
Despite the excitement of crizotinib's therapeutic success, there was a need to conceive new drugs with better brain penetrance, higher specificity and targeting a broader set of resistance mutations. As such, Novartis' ceritinib was approved by the FDA in April 2014 for treatment of NSCLC. It provided good brain penetrance and a significant progression-free survival benefit against chemotherapy in the first line as demonstrated in the ASCEND-4 trial.

Roche's alectinib was FDA approved Dec 2015 (accelerated) for patients who had progressed on crizotinib, with full approval in 2017 as a first-line treatment for ALK-positive NSCLC. Like ceritinib, it provided excellent brain penetrance and high response rates. It demonstrated a clear benefit against both first-line chemotherapy and first-line crizotinib. This was based on the phase 3 ALEX trial comparing it with crizotinib.

Ariad's and Takeda's brigatinib (also an inhibitor of mutated EGFR) was the latest second-generation inhibitor and was approved in April 2017 by the US FDA for ALK-positive NSCLC. It is very similar to alectinib in efficacy, while being active against some resistant mutations such as the common G1202R mutation that provides resistance to alectinib.

=== Third generation ===
Pfizer's lorlatinib was the first third-generation inhibitor and was approved in 2018 by the US FDA for ALK-positive NSCLC after progression on a first or second-generation inhibitor. Its macrocyclic structure was designed specifically to address some of the most recalcitrant resistance mutations. Still, most tumours eventually develop resistance through various mechanisms, namely compound-mutations (two or three mutations simultaneously) or activation of alternative pathways, such as the c-MET pathway.

Dirozalkib is next generation inhibitor. It was approved for use in China in August of 2025.

== Clinical trials ==
Additional ALK inhibitors currently (or soon to be) undergoing clinical trials include:

- Ensartinib (Xcovery's X-396, undergoing the eXalt3 Phase III multicenter clinical trial against crizotinib in ALK-TKI naïve patients who received up to one prior chemotherapy)
- Entrectinib (Nerviano's NMS-E628, licensed by Ignyta and renamed RXDX-101, in the U.S. orphan drug designation and rare pediatric disease designation for the treatment of neuroblastoma and orphan drug designation for treatment of TrkA-, TrkB-, TrkC-, ROS1- and ALK-positive NSCLC)
- Repotrectinib (TPX-0005, Turning Point Therapeutics)
- Envonalkib, approved in China for the treatment of non-small cell lung cancer (NSCLC)
- Belizatinib (TSR-011, Tesaro)
- Alkotinib (ZG-0418, a dual ALK/ROS1 inhibitor, Suzhou Zelgen Biopharmaceuticals)
- Foritinib (SAF-189, a dual ALK/ROS1 inhibitor undergoing a phase I/II trial as of 2020, Fochon Pharmaceuticals)
- CEP-37440 (Teva)
- TQ-B3139 (dual ALK/c-MET inhibitor by Chia Tai Tianqing Pharmaceuticals, undergoing a phase III clinical trial against crizotinib in TKI-naïve patients)
- PLB1003 (Beijing Pearl Biotechnology)
- Zotizalkib (TPX-0131, Turning Point Therapeutics)— a next generation ALK inhibitor, shown to work even against compound mutations resistant to lorlatinib
- Conteltinib (Shouyao Holdings, Beijing) - multi-kinase inhibitor that specifically targets ALK, FAK and Pyk2

Discontinued

- ASP-3026 (Astellas)
- Ficonalkib (Shouyao Holdings) currently in clinical trials for NSCLC

== Investigational combinations ==
While the response to ALK inhibitors is often very encouraging in patients with ALK+ NSCLC and lasts for a relatively long time, most of them eventually develop resistance, either through mutations in the ATP binding pocket or activation of alternative oncogenic pathways. Much research is being carried out on understanding the ways the cancer adapts and on how to reverse or delay resistance.

=== MEK pathway ===
The MEK pathway (short for MAPK/ERK-Kinase) has been extensively shown to be critical for the survival of tumour cells subjected to ALK inhibition. Inhibition of this pathway was shown to enhance response and delay the onset of resistance in preclinical models. As of 2020, three clinical trials are running to test the following combinations of ALK inhibitors with MEK inhibitors: brigatinib+binimetinib, ceritinib+trametinib, and alectinib+cobimetinib. Results for the last two are expected around 2020-2021.

=== EGFR/HER2 pathway ===
The EGFR and HER2 pathways are commonly abnormally activated in a large proportion of cancers. This was shown to be the case in preclinical models of ALK+ NSCLC subjected to ALK inhibition, both in vitro and in vivo. Surprisingly, cells were only sensitive to EGFR/HER2 inhibition when in the process of adapting to ALK inhibitors: both naïve cells and fully-adapted cells showed no measurable response to EGFR/HER2 inhibition alone. Currently, solid preclinical studies have been carried out with second-generation inhibitors combined with afatinib, erlotinib and lapatinib. In all cases, the responses were enhanced by the combination with respect to monotherapy, but seemed more pronounced in afatinib and lapatinib (dual EGFR/HER2 inhibitors) than in erlotinib (which only inhibits EGFR).

=== Anti-VEGF therapies ===
Several trials are investigating the combination of anti-VEGF antibody bevacizumab with ALK inhibitors such as alectinib and brigatinib. Bevacizumab is an antiangiogenic antibody, which normalizes the complex blood vessel structures around cancer and prevents new blood vessels from forming, thus starving the tumour and preventing its proliferation.

=== Local consolidation therapy ===
The use of either radiotherapy or surgery in addition to an ALK inhibitor is known as local consolidation therapy, and as of 2020, it is being investigated by three clinical trials. Their goal is to determine whether it delays resistance to the drugs compared with monotherapy. Some make use of SBRT (stereotactic body radiation therapy), a very precise radiation technique able to provide high doses with minimal side effects. Most trials of LCT in NSCLC focus on oligometastatic disease (under 3-5 lesions, depending on the definitions), but preliminary results of the BRIGHTSTAR trial indicate this method may be safe and well tolerated irrespective of the number of lesions.

== NPM-ALK ==
NPM-ALK is a different variation/fusion of ALK that drives anaplastic large-cell lymphomas (ALCLs) and is the target of other ALK inhibitors such as TAE-684.
