= MAM domain =

Identifiers
- Symbol: MAM
- Pfam: PF00629
- InterPro: IPR000998
- PROSITE: PDOC00604
- CDD: cd06263
Available protein structures:
- Pfam: structures / ECOD
- PDB: RCSB PDB; PDBe; PDBj
- PDBsum: structure summary
- PDB: 2c9aA:27-184

MAM domain is an evolutionary conserved protein domain. It is an extracellular domain found in many receptors.

A 170 amino acid domain, the so-called MAM (meprin, A-5 protein, and receptor protein-tyrosine phosphatase mu) domain, has been recognised in the extracellular region of functionally diverse proteins. These proteins have a modular, receptor-like architecture comprising a signal peptide, an N-terminal extracellular domain, a single transmembrane domain and an intracellular domain. Such proteins include meprin (a cell surface glycoprotein); A5 antigen (a developmentally-regulated cell surface protein; Xenopus nrp1; P28824); and receptor-like tyrosine protein phosphatase. The MAM domain is thought to have an adhesive function. It contains 4 conserved cysteine residues, which probably form disulphide bridges.

== Human proteins containing this domain ==
ALK; EGFL6; MAMDC2; MAMDC4; MDGA1; MDGA2; MEP1A; MEP1B; NPNT; NRP1; NRP2; PRSS7; PTPRK; PTPRM; PTPRO; PTPRT; PTPRU; ZAN
