= Inflammatory myofibroblastic tumour =

- Other names: Epithelioid inflammatory myofibroblastic sarcoma
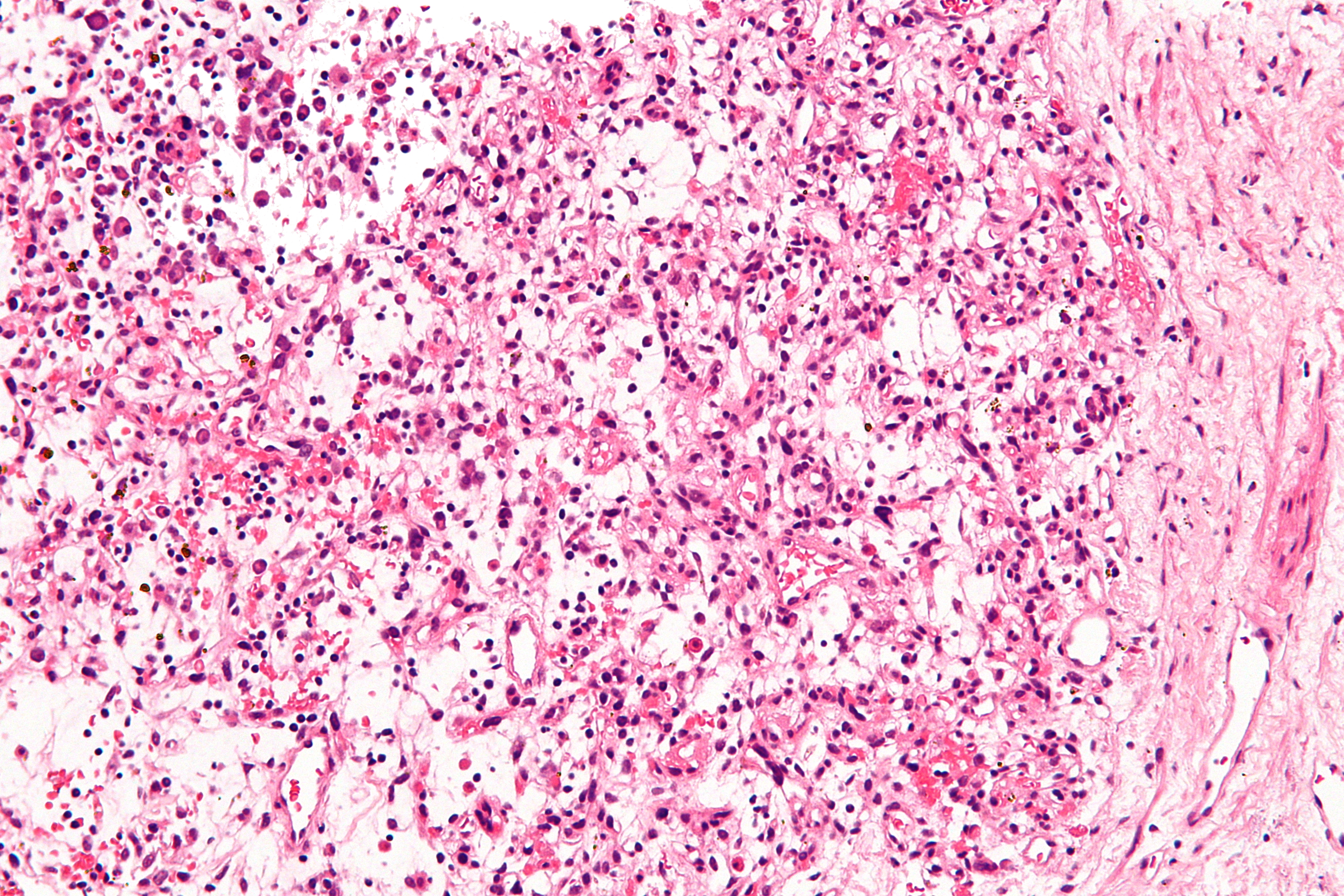
- Micrograph of an inflammatory myofibroblastic tumour of the kidney. Kidney biopsy. H&E stain.

Inflammatory myofibroblastic tumor (IMT) is a rare neoplasm of the mesodermal cells that form the connective tissues which support virtually all of the organs and tissues of the body. IMT was formerly termed inflammatory pseudotumor. Currently, however, inflammatory pseudotumor designates a large and heterogeneous group of soft tissue tumors that includes inflammatory myofibroblastic tumor, plasma cell granuloma, xanthomatous pseudotumor, solitary mast cell granuloma, inflammatory fibrosarcoma, pseudosarcomatous myofibroblastic proliferation, myofibroblastoma, inflammatory myofibrohistiocytic proliferation, and other tumors that develop from connective tissue cells. Inflammatory pseudotumour is a generic term applied to various neoplastic and non-neoplastic tissue lesions which share a common microscopic appearance consisting of spindle cells and a prominent presence of the white blood cells that populate chronic or, less commonly, acute inflamed tissues.

Inflammatory myofibroblastic tumor was initially regarded as a benign tumor that most often developed in the lung and less commonly in almost any organ system or tissue. Over time, however, IMT cases occurred in which the tumor spread into local tissues, metastasized to distal tissues, recurred after treatment, or consisted of neoplastic cells that had pro-malignant chromosome abnormalities. Consequently, the World Health Organization, 2013, and current literature commonly describe inflammatory myofibroblastic tumor as a neoplasm with intermediate malignant potential or a rarely metastasizing neoplasm. In 2020, the World Health Organization reclassified IMT as a specific tumor form in the category of intermediate (rarely metastasizing) fibroblastic and myofibroblastic tumors. In all events, IMT is a rare tumor with a reported incidence in 2009 of 150–200 cases/year in the United States.

IMT lesions typically consist of, and are defined by, myofibrolastic spindle cells, i.e. specialized cells that are longer than wide, have a microscopic appearance that merges the appearances of fibroblasts and smooth muscle cells (see myofibroblast), occur in normal as well as tumor tissues, and in normal tissues are commonly designated fibroblasts. However, the lesions in some IMF cases are dominated by sheets of epithelioid cells (which may have rounded shapes) with only a minor component of spindle cells. Tumors with these characteristics are regarded as a subtype of IMT termed epithelioid inflammatory myofibroblastic sarcoma (EIMS).

The tumors in IMT and EIMS consistently contain pro-inflammatory white blood cells and in most cases tumor cells that express highly abnormal oncogenic (cancer-causing) fusion proteins such as those that contain the active portion of anaplastic lymphoma kinase (ALK). It is not clear whether this inflammation, the genetic abnormalities, or both contribute to the development of IMT but drugs blocking the activities of the fusion proteins made by these genetic abnormalities may be useful in treating the disease.

== Signs and symptoms ==
IMT was regarded as a tumor that occurs in children or young adults and presented in the lung, mesentery, greater omentum or, less commonly, heart, liver, spleen, pancreas, colon, small intestine, spermatic cord, prostate, uterus, eye orbit, peripheral or central nervous system nerves, brain meninges, spinal cord, or other sites. However, a more recent retrospective study of 92 patients accumulated by the Surveillance, Epidemiology, and End Results (SEER) program of the National Cancer Institute found the mean age of disease onset was 47.4 years with peak occurrences at 0 to 4, 36 to 40, and >50 years old; middle-aged individuals (41 to 64 years) represented 1/3 of all cases. In this study, the commonest sites of tumor occurrence were the lower limb and hip (22% of cases), upper limb and shoulder (12% of cases), and head, face, and neck (9% of cases). Another recent study of 25 patients found the commonest sites of IMT were the abdomen (40% of cases) and lung/thoracic wall (32% of cases). Individual IMT cases are also reported to present in the urinary bladder, anal canal, and parameningeal spaces (i.e. sites adjacent to the meninges such as the nasopharynx, middle ear, paranasal sinuses, infratemporal fossa and pterygopalatine fossa). Apparently, the age and organ/tissue distribution of IMT varies with the patient population examined: in general it can present in individuals of almost any age and in almost any organ or tissue site. IMT most commonly presents as a tumor localized to a single site but may be associated with distal metastases in up to 5% of all cases or up to 10% of cases in which the tumor cells express an ALK fusion protein. The tumors range in size from 1–25 cm (average 6.5 cm) with two-thirds being 1.5–6.5 cm. In rare cases, the tumors have spontaneously regressed.

Individuals with IMT present with a wide range of symptoms (e.g. pain, swelling, a mass, organ dysfunction, etc.) depending on the tumor location(s). Up to 1/3 of these individuals have symptoms of systemic inflammation such as fever, chills, night sweats, and weight loss. Rare cases of IMT have developed in individuals with: a) organizing pneumonia; b) infection by Mycobacterium avium intracellulare or Corynebacterium equi (pneumonia-causing bacteria); Campylobacter jejuni (causes gastroenteritis); Lysinibacillus sphaericus (previously termed Bacillus sphaericus, a rare cause of lung infections and sepsis); Coxiella burneti (causes Q fever); Epstein–Barr virus (causes infectious mononucleosis and Epstein–Barr virus-associated lymphoproliferative malignant diseases); and E. coli-related occlusive phlebitis of intrahepatic veins; or c) previous abdominal surgery; trauma; ventriculoperitoneal shunt in the brain; radiation therapy; and corticosteroid usage. The relationship (i.e. cause or merely association) of these disease relationships to IMT is unknown.

== Molecular abnormalities ==
The neoplastic cells in 50–60% of IMT and all cases of EIMS express an abnormal ALK protein made by a somatic recombination in the ALK gene. ALK, i.e. anaplastic lymphoma kinase (also termed protein kinase B), is produced by the ALK gene. In IMT, the ALK gene has merged with a gene located at another site on the same or different chromosome to form a chimeric gene consisting of a part of the new gene and a part of the ALK gene coding for ALK's activity. This chimeric gene overproduces a fusion protein with excessive ALK activity. ALK is a serine/threonine-specific protein kinase that directly or indirectly stimulates PI3K/AKT/mTOR, Ras GTPase, ERKs, Janus kinase, STAT proteins, and other cell signaling elements. Activation of these elements stimulates cell growth, proliferation, survival, and other tumor-promoting behaviors. As an example of this chromosomal translocation, the ALK gene located on the short or "p" arm of chromosome 2 at position 23 (notated as 2p23) merges with the CLTC gene on the long, i.e. "q" arm of chromosome 17 at position 13 (notated 17q23) to form a chimeric gene notated as t(2;17)(p23;q23). This chimeric gene makes a CLTC-ALK fusion protein with uncontrolled ALK serine/threonine-specific protein kinase activity. Other genes that fuse with AKT found in IMT include: TFG, DCTN1, EML4, TPM3, TPM4, ATIC RANBP2 (most if not all RAMB2-ALK chimeric genes occur in the EMIS form of IMT), CARS1, and SEC31L1. IMT cases may express other chimeric genes in which the active parts of ROS1 (found in 10% of IFT cases and coding for a tyrosine kinase which promotes cell growth), PDGFRB (coding for a protein that may promote the development of cancer), and NTRK (coding for a receptor tyrosine kinase that may promote the development of cancer) merge with other genes. The fusion protein products of these chimeric genes, like those of ALK fusion proteins, are overproduced, overactive, and thereby may contribute to the development of IMT.

== Diagnosis ==
Histopathologic examination of the tumors in IMT generally reveals myofibroblastic spindle cell sheets in a myxoid background (i.e. a background matrix containing gelatinous mucopolysaccharides and non-sulfated glycosaminoglycans); the matrix also contains inflammatory cells, particularly plasma cells and lymphocytes occasionally mixed with eosinophils and neutrophils. The epithelioid inflammatory myofibroblastic sarcoma subtype of IMT shows sheets of epithelioid to round cells within a myxoid (i.e. appears blue or purple compared to the normal red appearance of connective tissue when appropriately H&E stained and examined under the microscope), collagenous, or mixed myxoid-collagenous matrix, <5% spindle cells, and an inflammatory cell infiltrate that in most cases consists predominantly of neutrophils or, less often, small lymphocytes or eosinophils; plasma cells occur in only a minority of EIMS cases. The neoplastic cells in the tumors of 50% to 60% of IMT cases and 100% of EIMS cases express an ALK fusion protein. Other genetic abnormalities occur in these cells. Testing for the presence of the ALK fusion protein and other genetic abnormalities (see next section) can help diagnose IMT.

== Treatment ==
Many sources recommend that localized IMT be treated with total resection of all tumorous tissues. Localized tumor recurrences may likewise be treated by total resection. There is little support for adding radiation or systemic chemotherapy to this regimen. Tumors that are not resectable, occur in inaccessible sites, are multifocal, or have metastasized are treated with aggressive therapeutic regimens.

In one retrospective study, 59 patients (all <25 years old) with IMT where treated with surgery. 31 had no residual disease post-surgery; 4 of these patients had local relapses, 3 of whom were again treated surgically and 1 with surgery plus chemotherapy. Nineteen had microscopic residual disease post-surgery. Post-surgery, 6 of these patients were treated with high-dose corticosteroids; 5 with vinblastine + methotrexate chemotherapy; 3 with inhibitors of ALK; 2 with vinorelbine + low-dose cycloheximide or Ifosfamide-based chemotherapy; and 1 with cyclophosphamide + vinchristine + actinomycin D chemotherapy. Of these 19 patients, 4 had complete responses, 8 partial responses, 5 stable disease, and 2 progressive disease. Nine patients had macroscopic disease post-surgery; 5 of these patients received vincristine + methotrexate; 2 received ALK inhibitors; and 1 each received either high-dose corticosteroids or Ifosfamide-based chemotherapy. Of these 9 patients, none had complete responses; 6 had partial responses; 1 had steady disease; and 2 had progressive disease. There were no deaths among the 59 patients. The various drug regimens showed little differences in effectiveness although patients treated with ALK inhibitors trended to have longer response times. Another retrospective study evaluated the response of 17 patients (aged 22–46 years; median age 32 years) with advanced disease to Adriamycin-based chemotherapy regimens, i.e. Adriamycin alone, Adriamycin + Ifosfamide, or Adriamicin + other chemotherapy drugs. No patients had a complete response, 8 patients had partial responses, 4 patients had steady disease, and 5 patients had progressive disease. Progression-free survival and overall survival times for the group were 6.6 and 21.2 months, respectively. The study also evaluated 9 patients (aged 12–31 years, median age 16) treated with methotrexate + vinblastine, methotrexate + vinorelbine, or vinblastine + vinorelbine; 2 patients attained complete responses, 3 attained partial responses, 2 had steady disease, and 2 had progressive disease; this groups' progression-free time was not reached while its overall survival time was 83.4 months. The study concluded that the Adriamycin-based and methotrexate/vinblastine/vinorelbine regimens have a high degree of activity in IMT. Due to the low numbers of patients evaluated, no conclusions could be made on which regimen(s) were most effective.

In addition to the report that compared the effect of ALK-inhibitors to other therapy regimens detailed in the previous paragraph, several reports have focused primarily on small numbers of IMT patients treated with an ALK inhibitor. The European Organisation for Research and Treatment of Cancer evaluated the effect of the ALK-inhibitor, crizotinib, on 12 ALK-positive IMT adults who had persistent and/or metastatic disease following surgical and/or drug treatment: 2 patients had complete responses, 4 had partial responses, 5 had steady disease, and none had progressive disease; 9 of these patients had at least 1 year of progression-free survival but one patient died of the disease. A review of previously published IMT patients of all ages found that: 1) 4 patients (3 with unifocal, 1 with multifocal disease) without prior treatment had complete responses to crizotinin; 2) 2 patients (1 with unifocal, 1 with multifocal disease) that had persistent disease after surgery and previously treated with chemotherapy had partial responses to crizotinib while 1 patient previously treated with a corticosteroid, prednisone, continued to have progressive disease on crizotinib; and 3) 6 patients with progressive disease after surgery (due to multifocal or unifocal disease in inaccessible sites) had complete responses (2 cases), partial responses (2 cases), stable disease (1 case), or progressive disease (1 case) in response to crizotinib. Two of these crizotinib-treated patients with progressive disease had near complete responses to second generation ALK inhibitors Another study reviewed 29 pediatric patients (age 15 months to 17 years) who were treated with an ALK inhibitor followed by surgical removal of the tumor (5 cases), surgical tumor removal followed by an ALK inhibitor (12 cases), or an ALK inhibitor without surgery. Twelve patients had complete responses, 14 partial responses, 2 stable disease, and 2 recurrences after finishing ALK inhibitor treatment. The latter two patients obtained complete responses to retreatment with crizotinib (1 case) or a second generation ALK inhibitor, ceritinib (1 case). A study of 14 pediatric patients with metastatic or inoperable ALK-positive IMT were treated with crizotinib: 5 patients obtained complete responses, 7 partial responses, and 2 stable disease. Over the study period (2–63 months), no patient developed progressive disease. Numerous Medical history studies have had similar results in treated IMT with ALK inhibitors. However, ALK inhibitors have serious side effects; in on study, crizotinib treatment was associated with pneumonia, fever of unknown cause, heart attack, sepsis, abdominal abscess, acute renal insufficiency, and the development of an abnormal EKG (i.e. QT prolongation). Entrectinib, a tyrosine kinase inhibitor that is active on ROS1 and NRTK as well as AKT, has shown clinically significant activity in individual cases of patients with IMT expressing ROS1, NRTK, and/or an ALK fusion proteins.

== See also ==
- Anaplastic lymphoma kinase-positive neoplasias
- ALK inhibitors
- Inflammatory myeloblastic tumor
