= Inflammatory pseudotumor =

Cell proliferation involving spindle cells

An inflammatory pseudotumor is a cell proliferation and inflammation involving spindle cells, which may occur in many parts of the body, and is of unknown case.

According to the WHO classification, three lesional patterns can be observed:

- Inflammatory myofibroblastic tumour, that can be associated with an ALK gene rearrangement
- Plasmocytic pattern ("plasma cell granuloma"), that can be linked to IgG4-related disease
- Fibrous and hyalinizing pattern: Pulmonary hyalinizing granuloma
