= ALK positive lung cancer =

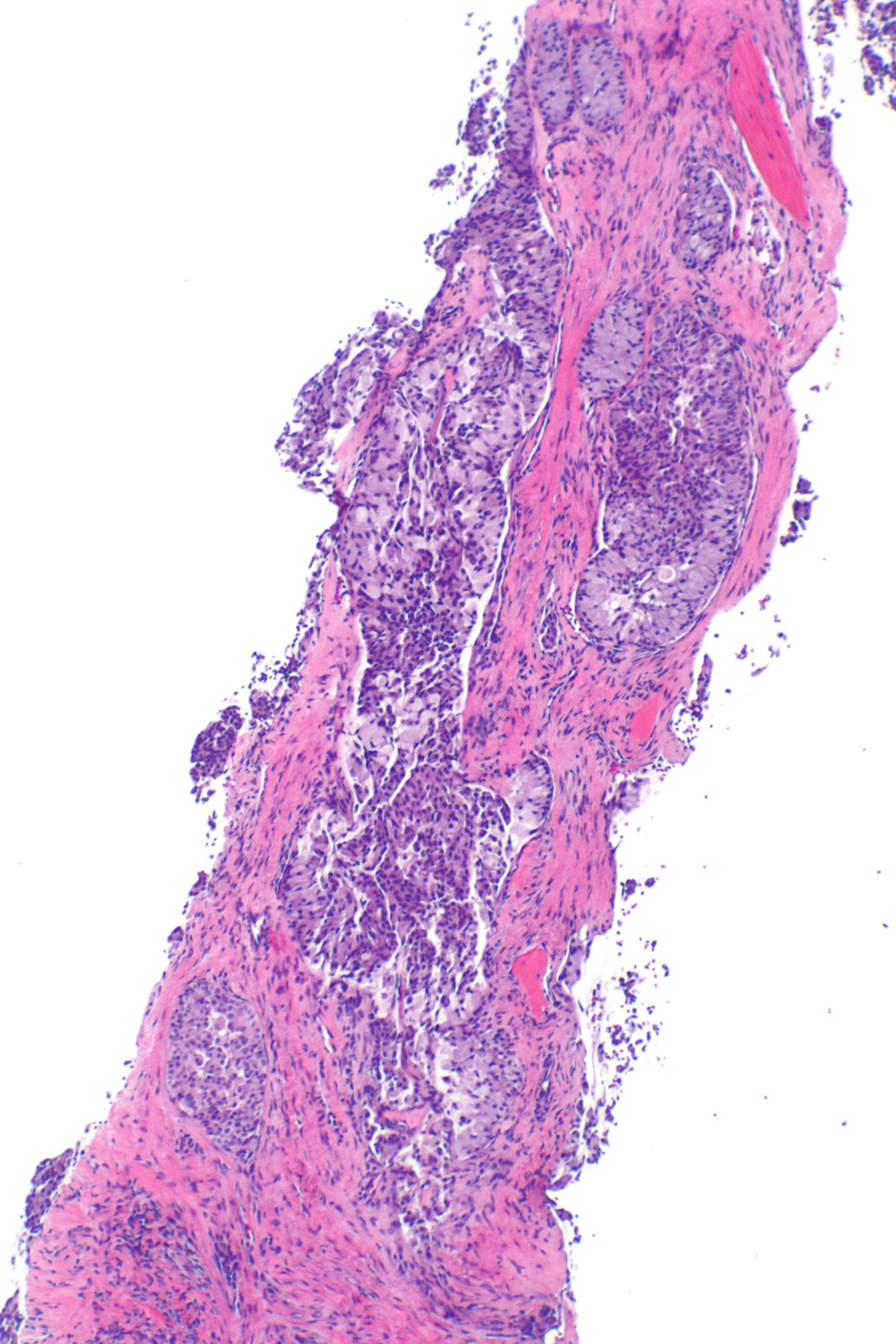
- Micrograph showing ALK positive lung adenocarcinoma. H&E stain.
- Specialty: Oncology

ALK positive lung cancer is a primary malignant lung tumor whose cells contain a characteristic abnormal configuration of DNA wherein, most frequently, the echinoderm microtubule-associated protein-like 4 (EML4) gene is fused to the anaplastic lymphoma kinase (ALK) gene. Less frequently, there will be novel translocation partners for the ALK gene, in place of EML4. This abnormal gene fusion leads to the production of a protein that appears, in many cases, to promote and maintain the malignant behavior of the cancer cells.

The transforming EML4-ALK fusion gene was first reported in non-small cell lung carcinoma (NSCLC) in 2007.

== Signs and symptoms ==
The signs and symptoms of this cancer include

- A cough that doesn't go away
- Chest pain that gets worse with deep breathing, coughing, or laughing
- Hoarseness
- Weight loss without trying or loss of appetite
- Coughing up blood
- Shortness of breath
- A weak or tired feeling
- Wheezing

== Diagnosis ==
=== Classification ===
Most lung carcinomas containing the ALK gene fusion are adenocarcinomas.

Some studies suggest that the papillary adenocarcinoma and the signet ring cell adenocarcinoma variants are more likely to carry this fused gene than other histological variants.

The median age at diagnosis is around 50 years and the majority are female.

== Screening ==
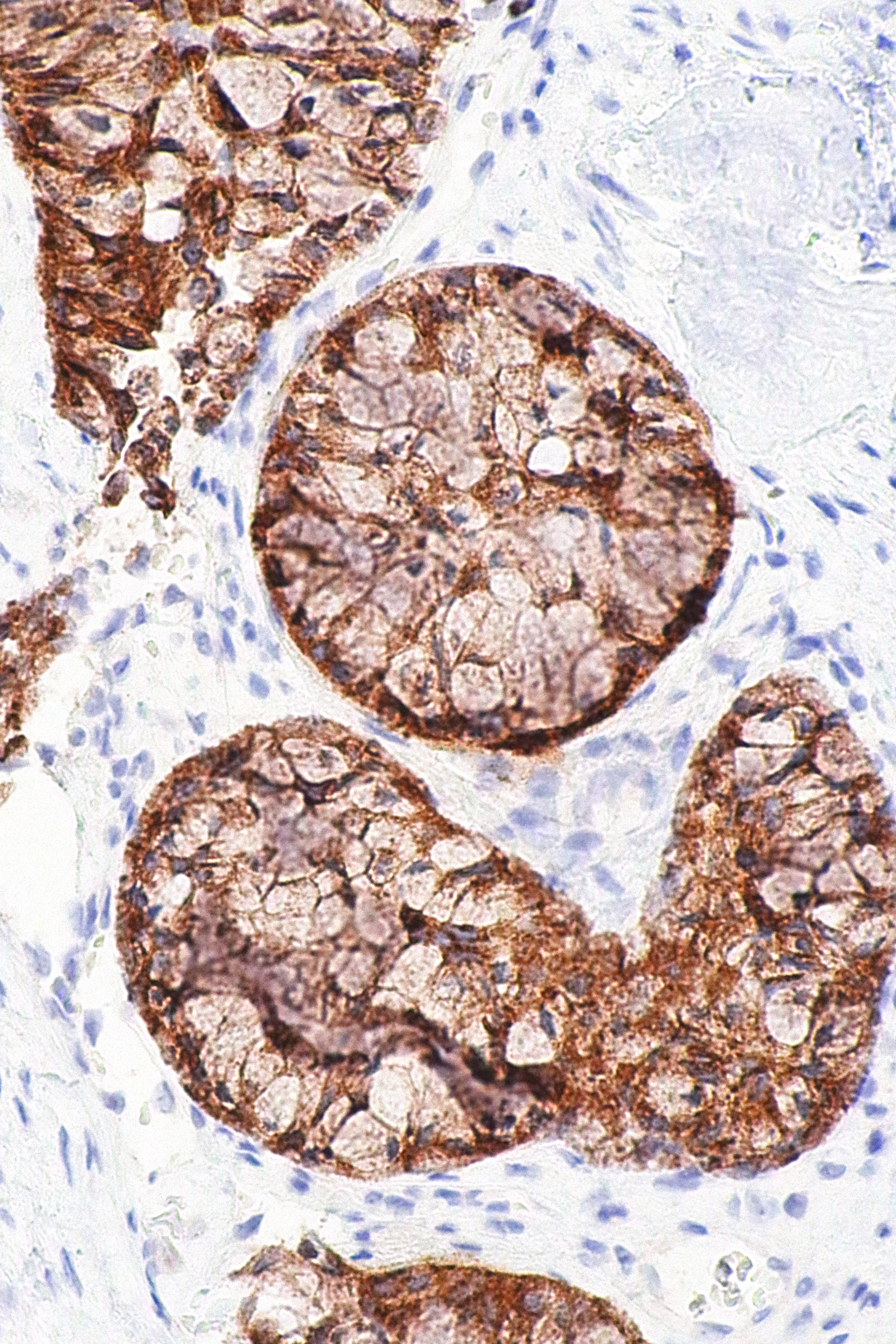
Micrograph showing an ALK positive adenocarcinoma of the lung. ALK immunostain.

Screening for ALK positive lung cancer is now a standard of care and strongly recommended by the American Society of Clinical Oncology as well as the European Society of Medical Oncology. Screening in the United States is most often done with immunohistochemistry (IHC) staining or FISH.

== Treatment ==
Crizotinib is a targeted therapy (FDA approved in 2011), manufactured by Pfizer and marketed under the brand name Xalkori and Crizalk that targets the EML4/ALK fusion gene.

Ceritinib is a second generation targeted therapy (FDA approved in 2014), manufactured by Novartis and sold under the brand name Zykadia that also targets the EML4 fusion gene. When compared to Crizotinib, early studies showed Ceritinib and other second generation ALK inhibitors demonstrated superior central nervous system (CNS) penetration leading to superior anti-tumor response in patients with metastatic disease to the CNS.

Alectinib another second generation targeted therapy and was approved (for this) in Japan in 2014 and by US FDA in 2015. It is manufactured by Genentech and marketed under the brand name Alecensa.

Brigatinib a second generation targeted therapy (FDA approved in 2017), manufactured by Takeda and is marketed under the brand name Alunbrig.

Ensartinib is a second generation targeted therapy (trial drug X-396), manufactured by XCovery.

Lorlatinib is a third generation targeted therapy (FDA approved in 2018), manufactured by Pfizer.

NVL-655 is a fourth generation targeted therapy (currently in clinical trials), developed by Nuvalent.

Although treatment with immune checkpoint inhibitors has proved effective with some types of non-small cell lung cancer, it seems to be generally ineffective with ALK positive non-small cell lung cancer.

== Prognosis ==
Treatment with crizotinib achieves 60% response rate. However, crizotinib showed no improvement on overall survival compared to chemotherapy. This may be due to the fact that there was a 70% crossover rate to crizotinib in patients treated initially with chemotherapy. Also, patients who tested negative for EML4/ALK fusion had a response rate to crizotinib of up to 35%.

According to patient advocacy group ALK Positive, a study in December 2018 found that the median survival for people with stage 4 (IV) ALK-positive lung cancer was 6.8 years with the right care.

== Epidemiology ==
EML4-ALK gene fusions occur almost exclusively in carcinomas arising in non-smokers. About 4% of non-small-cell lung carcinomas involve an EML4-ALK tyrosine kinase fusion gene. 4–6% of lung adenocarcinomas involve the fusion gene.

EML4-ALK mutation rarely occurs in combination with K-RAS or EGFR mutations.
