= Targeted therapy of lung cancer =

- Specialty: Oncology

Targeted therapy of lung cancer refers to using agents specifically designed to selectively target molecular pathways responsible for, or that substantially drive, the malignant phenotype of lung cancer cells, and as a consequence of this (relative) selectivity, cause fewer toxic effects on normal cells.

Most previous chemotherapy drugs for cancer were (relatively) nonselective in their activity. Although their exact mechanisms of action were varied and complex, they generally worked by damaging cells undergoing mitosis, which is usually more common in malignant tumors than in most normal tissues. Targeted agents are designed to be selective in their effects by modulating the activity of proteins necessary and essential for oncogenesis and maintenance of cancer, particularly enzymes driving the uncontrolled growth, angiogenesis, invasiveness, and metastasis characteristic of malignant tumors. The increased differential activity usually results in fewer troubling side effects for cancer patients, particularly less nausea, vomiting, and death of cells in the bone marrow and gastrointestinal tract, and increased effectiveness against tumor cells.

== Traditional lung cancer classification and treatment ==
Lung cancer is an extremely heterogeneous family of malignant neoplasms, with well over 50 different histological variants recognized under the 4th revision of the World Health Organization (WHO) typing system, currently the most widely used lung cancer classification scheme. Because these variants have differing genetic, biological, and clinical properties, including response to treatment, correct classification of lung cancer cases are necessary to assure that lung cancer patients receive optimum management.

Approximately 98% of lung cancers are carcinoma, a term describing malignancies derived from transformed cells exhibiting characteristics of epithelium. About 2% of all lung cancers are non-carcinoma (mainly sarcoma, tumors of hematopoietic origin, or germ cell tumors. These forms of lung cancer are usually treated differently from carcinomas. Because of the ubiquity of lung carcinomas, however, the term "lung cancer" generally refers to carcinomas in everyday clinical practice.

Despite the large number of histological variants of lung carcinoma, oncologists have long tended to favor a dichotomous division into small cell and non-small cell forms, based on differences in clinical behavior and response to treatment. Most small cell lung carcinomas (SCLC's) metastasize to distant organs early on in their course, rendering surgery ineffective in curing the cancer. In contrast, non-small cell lung carcinomas (NSCLC's) are more likely to remain localized to the thorax during development, and are thus more amenable to cure using radical surgical resection. Additionally, SCLC's are typically much more sensitive to chemotherapy and/or radiation therapy than are NSCLC's. Therefore, current traditional treatment guidelines and standards of care recommend, when possible, the use of surgery for NSCLC, and chemotherapy with or without radiotherapy for SCLC.

== Agents in current use ==
While a very large number of agents targeting various molecular pathways are being developed and tested, the main classes and agents that are now being used in lung cancer treatment include:

- Inhibitors of Epidermal growth factor receptor (EGFR)
  - tyrosine kinase inhibitors (TKI's):
    - erlotinib (Tarceva)
    - gefitinib (Iressa)
    - osimertinib (Tagrisso)
  - monoclonal antibody against EGFR:
    - cetuximab (Erbitux)
- Inhibitors of vascular endothelial growth factor (VEGF)
  - bevacizumab (Avastin)
- Inhibitor of EML4-ALK
  - crizotinib shows benefit in a subset of non-small cell lung cancer that is characterized by the EML4-ALK fusion oncogene, found in some relatively young, never or light smokers with adenocarcinoma.

== Non-small cell lung cancer ==
Targeted agents are beginning to permit the design of more rational treatment regimens for non-small cell lung cancer (NSCLC), which comprises about 80% to 85% of all lung cancers.

While there have been no randomized clinical trials of targeted agents in combined small-cell lung carcinoma (c-SCLC), some small case series suggest that some may be useful in c-SCLC. Many targeted agents appear more active in certain NSCLC variants. Given that c-SCLC contains components of NSCLC, and that the chemoradioresistance of NSCLC components impact the effectiveness of c-SCLC treatment, these agents may permit the design of more rational treatment regimens for c-SCLC.

EGFR-TKI's have been found to be active against variants exhibiting certain mutations in the EGFR gene. While EGFR mutations are very rare (<5%) in "pure" SCLC, they are considerably more common (about 15–20%) in c-SCLC, particularly in non-smoking females whose c-SCLC tumors contain an adenocarcinoma component. These patients are much more likely to have classical EGFR mutations in the small cell component of their tumors as well, and their tumors seem to be more likely to respond to treatment with EGFR-TKI's. EGFR-targeted agents appear particularly effective in papillary adenocarcinoma, non-mucinous bronchioloalveolar carcinoma, and adenocarcinoma with mixed subtypes.

Bevacizumab may improve some measures of survival in both SCLC and non-squamous cell variants of NSCLC.

Pemetrexed, although not classified as a targeted agent, has been shown to have improve survival in non-squamous cell NSCLC, and is the first drug to reveal differential survival benefit in large cell lung carcinoma.

C-SCLC appear to express female hormone (i.e. estrogen and/or progesterone) receptors in a high (50%-67%) proportion of cases, similar to breast carcinomas However, it is at present unknown whether blockade of these receptors affects the growth of c-SCLC.

Several studies have shown that EGFR-TKI's are particularly active in papillary and non-mucinous bronchioloalveolar carcinoma variants of adenocarcinoma.

Bevacizumab is contraindicated in squamous cell carcinoma and its variants.

Pemetrexed has been approved for treating non-squamous lung carcinomas, and is the first drug that has been specifically shown to improve survival in large cell carcinoma.

== Small-cell lung cancer ==
To date, most clinical trials of newer targeted agents - both alone and in combination with previously tested treatment regimens - have either been less effective, or no more effective, than older platinum-based doublets in SCLC.

== Combined small-cell lung cancer ==
The term "combined small-cell lung carcinoma" (c-SCLC) refers to a multiphasic lung cancer that contains a component of SCLC admixed with one (or more) components of NSCLC. It is currently considered a variant of SCLC under the current World Health Organization lung tumor classification scheme. While the true incidence of c-SCLC is unknown, case series suggest that they may account for as many as 25% to 30% of all cases of SCLC, and for 4% to 6% of all lung cancer cases.

Traditionally, c-SCLC have been treated according to guidelines established for "pure" SCLC.

To date, most clinical trials of targeted agents, alone and in combination with previously tested treatment regimens, have either been ineffective in SCLC or no more effective than standard platinum-based doublets.

While there have been no randomized clinical trials of targeted agents in c-SCLC, some small case series suggest that some agents currently in use may be beneficial in c-SCLC. Many targeted agents appear more active in certain NSCLC variants. Given that c-SCLC contains components of NSCLC, and that the chemoradioresistance of NSCLC components impact the effectiveness of c-SCLC treatment, these agents may permit the design of more rational treatment regimens for c-SCLC.
