= Ficonalkib =

Clinical data
- Other names: CT-3505; LTK tyrosine kinase inhibitor; SY-3505

Legal status
- Legal status: investigational

Identifiers
- IUPAC name: 2-N-[4-[4-(dimethylamino)piperidin-1-yl]-2-methoxyphenyl]-4-N-(2-propan-2-ylsulfonylphenyl)-6,7-dihydro-5H-pyrrolo[2,3-d]pyrimidine-2,4-diamine
- CAS Number: 2233574-95-1
- PubChem CID: 135211735
- IUPHAR/BPS: 12378
- DrugBank: DB18774
- ChemSpider: 128921345
- UNII: 8EPZ3U4PSS
- ChEBI: CHEBI:759167
- ChEMBL: ChEMBL5314461

Chemical and physical data
- Formula: C_{29}H_{39}N_{7}O_{3}S
- Molar mass: 565.74 g·mol^{−1}
- 3D model (JSmol): Interactive image
- SMILES: CC(C)S(=O)(=O)C1=CC=CC=C1NC2=NC(=NC3=C2CCN3)NC4=C(C=C(C=C4)N5CCC(CC5)N(C)C)OC
- InChI: InChI=InChI=1S/C29H39N7O3S/c1-19(2)40(37,38)26-9-7-6-8-24(26)31-28-22-12-15-30-27(22)33-29(34-28)32-23-11-10-21(18-25(23)39-5)36-16-13-20(14-17-36)35(3)4/h6-11,18-20H,12-17H2,1-5H3,(H3,30,31,32,33,34); Key:LDTJJGGYLQQRSP-UHFFFAOYSA-N

Ficonalkib is an investigational new drug that is being evaluated by Shouyao Holdings for the treatment of non-small cell lung cancer (NSCLC). It is an anaplastic lymphoma kinase (ALK) inhibitor.

Ficonalkib is a third generation ALK inhibitor that is active against both wild-type as well as a range of resistant mutants that develop from first and second generation ALK targeted drugs.

== Clinical trials ==
Ficonalkib is currently in phase 3 clinical trials for non-small cell lung cancer.
