= Endopeptidase-2 =

Endopeptidase-2 may refer to:

- Neprilysin, an enzyme
- Meprin A, an enzyme
