= ROS1 =

Protein-coding gene in the species Homo sapiens

Identifiers
- Aliases: ROS1, MCF3, ROS, c-ros-1, ROS proto-oncogene 1, receptor tyrosine kinase
- External IDs: OMIM: 165020; MGI: 97999; GeneCards: ROS1
Available structures
PDB	Ortholog search: PDBe RCSB
PDB	List of PDB id codes 3ZBF, 4UXL
Enzyme activity
EC #	BRENDA	ExPASy	KEGG	MetaCyc
2.7.10.1	↗	↗	↗	↗

Gene location (Human)
Chr.	Chromosome 6 (human)
Band	6q22.1	Start	117,287,353 bp
Band	6q22.1	End	117,425,942 bp

Gene location (Mouse)
Chr.	Chromosome 10 (mouse)
Band	10 B3|10 26.18 cM	Start	51,921,817 bp
Band	10 B3|10 26.18 cM	End	52,071,340 bp
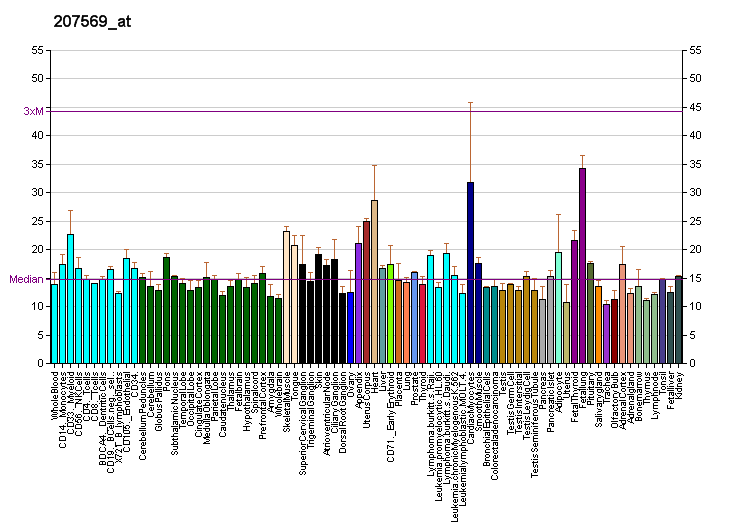
RNA expression pattern
Bgee	Human / Mouse (ortholog); Top expressed in: upper lobe of left lung; corpus epididymis; right lung; lower lobe of lung; testicle; muscle of thigh; visceral pleura; decidua; caput epididymis; Brodmann area 9 / Top expressed in: semen; epithelium of small intestine; ileum; duodenum; precursor cell; lumbar subsegment of spinal cord; migratory enteric neural crest cell; spermatid; submandibular gland; central gray substance of midbrain; More reference expression data
BioGPS	More reference expression data
Gene ontology
Molecular function	transferase activity; nucleotide binding; protein kinase activity; kinase activity; protein binding; transmembrane receptor protein tyrosine kinase activity; protein tyrosine kinase activity; protein phosphatase binding; ATP binding; receptor tyrosine kinase; transmembrane signaling receptor activity
Cellular component	integral component of membrane; membrane; plasma membrane; cell surface; perinuclear region of cytoplasm; cytoplasm; integral component of plasma membrane; receptor complex
Biological process	cell differentiation; regulation of TOR signaling; signal transduction; phosphorylation; transmembrane receptor protein tyrosine kinase signaling pathway; regulation of phosphate transport; negative regulation of gene expression; protein phosphorylation; spermatogenesis; regulation of ERK1 and ERK2 cascade; peptidyl-tyrosine autophosphorylation; cell population proliferation; columnar/cuboidal epithelial cell development; regulation of cell growth; negative regulation of signal transduction; negative regulation of apoptotic process; positive regulation of ERK1 and ERK2 cascade
Sources:Amigo / QuickGO
Orthologs
Databases	NCBI: entry; OMA: entry
Species	Human	Mouse
Entrez	6098	19886
Ensembl	ENSG00000047936	ENSMUSG00000019893
UniProt	P08922	Q78DX7
RefSeq (mRNA)	NM_002944; NM_001378891; NM_001378902	NM_011282
RefSeq (protein)	NP_002935; NP_001365820; NP_001365831	NP_035412
Location (UCSC)	Chr 6: 117.29 – 117.43 Mb	Chr 10: 51.92 – 52.07 Mb
PubMed search
- Wikidata
View/Edit Human	View/Edit Mouse

Proto-oncogene tyrosine-protein kinase ROS is an enzyme that in humans is encoded by the ROS1 gene.

This proto-oncogene, highly expressed in a variety of tumor cell lines, belongs to the sevenless subfamily of tyrosine kinase insulin receptor genes. The protein encoded by this gene is a type I integral membrane protein with tyrosine kinase activity. The protein may function as a growth or differentiation factor receptor.

== Structure ==
Proto-oncogene tyrosine-protein kinase ROS (ROS1) is a type I integral membrane protein and a member of the receptor tyrosine kinase (RTK) family. Structurally, it is a large protein composed of 2,347 amino acid residues and features a single transmembrane domain that anchors it to the plasma membrane. The extracellular region is responsible for ligand binding, whereas the intracellular region contains the tyrosine kinase domain, which catalyzes the phosphorylation of specific tyrosine residues in substrates. ROS1 shows a typical RTK organization: an extracellular ligand-binding domain, a single α-helical transmembrane segment, and a cytoplasmic domain containing the highly conserved ATP-binding and active sites required for kinase activity. The cytoplasmic segment also includes regions crucial for downstream signaling interactions.

== Function ==
Proto-oncogene tyrosine-protein kinase ROS (ROS1) is a receptor tyrosine kinase (RTK) that is evolutionarily conserved and involved in epithelial cell differentiation during organ development. Its precise physiological role in humans is not yet fully defined, but evidence suggests it functions in normal cellular signaling and developmental processes.

Upon ligand binding (e.g., by NELL2), ROS1 activates several downstream cellular signaling pathways, contributing to epithelial cell differentiation, cell growth, and survival.

== Clinical significance ==
=== Role in cancer ===
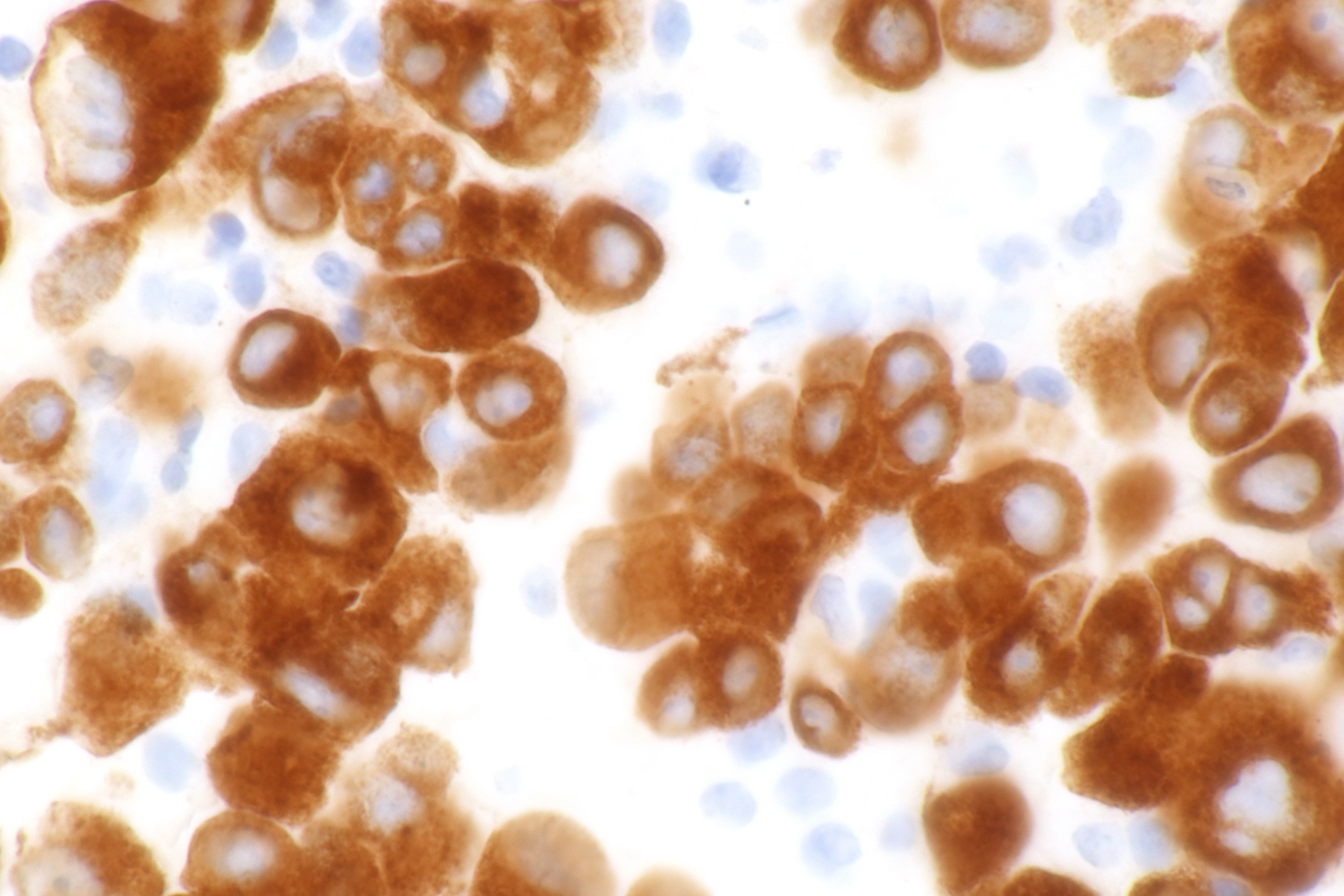
Micrograph showing a ROS1-positive adenocarcinoma of the lung. ROS1 immunostain.

ROS1 is a receptor tyrosine kinase (encoded by the gene ROS1) with structural similarity to the anaplastic lymphoma kinase (ALK) protein; it is encoded by the c-ros oncogene and was first identified in 1986. The exact role of the ROS1 protein in normal development, as well as its normal physiologic ligand, have not been defined. Nonetheless, as gene rearrangement events involving ROS1 have been described in lung and other cancers, and since such tumors have been found to be remarkably responsive to small molecule tyrosine kinase inhibitors, interest in identifying ROS1 rearrangements as a therapeutic target in cancer has been increasing. In 2016, the small molecule tyrosine kinase inhibitor, crizotinib, was approved for the treatment of patients with metastatic NSCLC whose tumors are ROS1-positive.

Gene rearrangements involving the ROS1 gene were first detected in glioblastoma tumors and cell lines. In 2007 a ROS1 rearrangement was identified in a cell line derived from a lung adenocarcinoma patient. Since that discovery, multiple studies have demonstrated an incidence of approximately 1% in lung cancers, demonstrated oncogenicity, and showed that inhibition of tumor cells bearing ROS1 gene fusions by crizotinib or other ROS1 tyrosine kinase inhibitors was effective in vitro. Clinical data supports the use of crizotinib in lung cancer patients with ROS1 gene fusions. Preclinical and clinical work suggests multiple potential mechanisms of drug resistance in ROS1 + lung cancer, including kinase domain mutations in ROS1 and bypass signaling via RAS and EGFR. Although the most preclinical and clinical studies of ROS1 gene fusions have been performed in lung cancer, ROS1 fusions have been detected in multiple other tumor histologies, including ovarian carcinoma, sarcoma, cholangiocarcinomas and others. Crizotinib or other ROS1 inhibitors may be effective in other tumor histologies beyond lung cancer as demonstrated by a patient with an inflammatory myofibroblastic tumor harboring a ROS1 fusion with a dramatic response to crizotinib.

=== Fusion prevalence ===
In patients with NSCLC, approximately 2% are positive for a ROS1 gene rearrangement, and these rearrangements are mutually exclusive of ALK rearrangement. ROS1 fusion-positive patients tend to be younger, with a median age of 49.8 years, and never-smokers, with a diagnosis of adenocarcinoma. There is a higher representation of Asian ethnicity and patients with Stage IV disease. ROS1 rearrangements are estimated to be roughly half as common as ALK-rearranged NSCLCs. Similar to ALK-rearranged, ROS1-rearranged NSCLC have younger age of onset and a non-smoking history. A benefit of a small-molecule ALK, ROS1, and cMET inhibitor, crizotinib, was also shown in this patient group.

ROS1 expression was found in approximately 2% of NSCLC patients, and its expression was limited to those patients with ROS1 gene fusions. Similar findings were reported in a separate analysis of 447 NSCLC samples, of which 1.2% were found to be positive for ROS1 rearrangement; this study also confirmed the activity of the ALK/ROS1 /cMET inhibitor crizotinib in ROS1 -positive tumors. ROS1 fusions were also identified in approximately 2% of adenocarcinomas and 1% of glioblastoma samples in an assessment of kinase fusions across different cancers.

Table 1: Sampling of ROS1 Rearrangements Observed in NSCLC and Other Cancers. All of the kinase fusions retain the tyrosine kinase domain of ROS1 . List is not exhaustive. (Adapted from Stumpfova 2012).

Cancer Type	ROS1 Fusion Gene
NSCLC	FIG - ROS1*; SLC34A2 - ROS1*; CD74 - ROS1*; SDC - ROS1*; EZR - ROS1; LRIG3 - ROS1; TPM3 - ROS1
Gastric	SLC34A2 - ROS1*
Colorectal	SLC34A2 - ROS1*
Spitzoid melanoma	TPM3 - ROS1
Cholangiosarcoma	FIG - ROS1*
Glioblastoma	FIG - ROS1*
Ovarian	FIG - ROS1*
Angiosarcoma	CEP85L-ROS1

* Multiple variant isoforms observed

CD74; cluster of differentiation 74, long/short isoforms; EZR; ezrin; FIG; fused in glioblastoma; SDC4; LRIG3; leucine-rich repeats and immunoglobulin-like domains 3; SDC; syndecan 4; SLC34A2; solute carrier family 34 (sodium phosphate), member 2; TPM3; tropomyosin 3

=== As a drug target ===
Several drugs target ROS1 fusions in cancer, with varying levels of success; most of the drugs to date have been tested only for ROS1-positive non-small cell lung carcinoma (NSCLC). However, some clinical trials (like those for entrectinib, DS-6051b, and TPX-0005) accept patients with ROS1 cancer in any type of solid tumor.

- Crizotinib is approved for treating metastatic ROS1-positive NSCLC in many countries. In clinical trials, crizotinib was shown to be effective for 70-80% of ROS1+ NSCLC patients, but it does not effectively treat the brain. Some patients have a response that lasts for years. Crizotinib is available to patients with solid tumors other than NSCLC through clinical trials.
- Entrectinib (RXDX-101) is a selective tyrosine kinase inhibitor developed by Ignyta, Inc., with specificity, at low nanomolar concentrations, for all of three Trk proteins (encoded by the three NTRK genes, respectively) as well as the ROS1, and ALK receptor tyrosine kinases. An open label, multicenter, global phase 2 clinical trial called STARTRK-2 started in 2015 to test the drug in patients with ROS1/NTRK/ALK gene rearrangements.
- Lorlatinib (also known as PF-06463922) was shown in an ongoing Phase 2 clinical trial to be effective in some ROS1+ NSCLC patients, and treats the cancer in the brain as well as the body. Lorlatinib has the potential to overcome certain resistance mutations that develop during treatment with crizotinib.
- Ceritinib demonstrates clinical activity (including treating the brain) in ROS1+ NSCLC patients who had previously received platinum-based chemotherapy. In preclinical studies, ceritinib is unable to overcome most ROS1 resistance mutations, including ROS1 G2032R. It has more severe side effects than crizotinib for some patients. Ceritinib is US FDA approved for first line treatment of ALK+ metastatic non-small cell lung cancer.
- TPX-0005 preclinical data suggests it is a potent inhibitor of ROS1+ cancer. A Phase I clinical trial opened in March 2017 for patients with advanced solid tumors harboring ALK, ROS1, or NTRK1-3 rearrangements.
- DS-6051b preclinical data show it is active against ROS1-positive cancers. It is an ongoing clinical trial.
- Cabozantinib preclinical data has shown the drug might overcome crizotinib resistance in ROS1+ cancer in early studies. However, the required dosage makes the drug difficult to tolerate for many patients. Cabozantinib is US FDA approved for metastatic medullary thyroid cancer (as Cometriq) and renal cell carcinoma (as Cabometyx).

== Research ==
From a large-scale survey of tyrosine kinase activity in non-small cell lung cancer (NSCLC), and identified more than 50 distinct tyrosine kinases and over 2500 downstream substrates, with the goal of identifying candidate oncogenes. In a sampling of 96 tissue samples from NSCLC patients, approximately 30% displayed high levels of phosphotyrosine expression; further analysis was conducted to identify highly phosphorylated tyrosine kinases in NSCLC from a panel of 41 NSCLC cell lines, and 150 patient samples. Among the top 20 receptor tyrosine kinases identified in this analysis, 15 were identified in both cell lines and tumors, and among these were both ALK and ROS1. These initial findings paved the way for more expansive analyses of ROS1 kinase fusions in NSCLC and other cancers.

== The ROS1ders ==
The ROS1ders is a worldwide collaboration of ROS1+ cancer patients and caregivers with a goal of improving patient outcomes and accelerating research for any type of ROS1+ cancer. It is the first such collaboration focused on cancers driven by a single oncogene. Their website tracks targeted therapies, clinical trials, world experts and new developments for ROS1+ cancers. Partners include patient-focused nonprofits, clinicians who treat ROS1+ patients, ROS1 researchers, pharmaceutical firms and biotech companies.
