= Dirozalkib =

Investigational drug

Identifiers
- IUPAC name: 5-Chloro-2-N-(6-methyl-5-piperidin-4-yl-2,3-dihydro-1,4-benzodioxin-8-yl)-4-N-(2-propan-2-ylsulfonylphenyl)pyrimidine-2,4-diamine
- CAS Number: 1893419-37-8
- PubChem CID: 121260977
- IUPHAR/BPS: 13811
- UNII: 2FH56C28YT

Chemical and physical data
- Formula: C_{27}H_{32}ClN_{5}O_{4}S
- Molar mass: 558.09 g·mol^{−1}
- 3D model (JSmol): Interactive image
- SMILES: CC1=CC(=C2C(=C1C3CCNCC3)OCCO2)NC4=NC=C(C(=N4)NC5=CC=CC=C5S(=O)(=O)C(C)C)Cl
- InChI: InChI=1S/C27H32ClN5O4S/c1-16(2)38(34,35)22-7-5-4-6-20(22)31-26-19(28)15-30-27(33-26)32-21-14-17(3)23(18-8-10-29-11-9-18)25-24(21)36-12-13-37-25/h4-7,14-16,18,29H,8-13H2,1-3H3,(H2,30,31,32,33); Key:ABKQZNVWMCRCGQ-UHFFFAOYSA-N

Dirozalkib is a drug that was developed by Xuanzhu Biopharmaceutical for the treatment of non-small cell lung cancer. It is an anaplastic lymphoma kinase inhibitor.

It was approved for use in China in August of 2025.
