= MEP1A =

Protein-coding gene in the species Homo sapiens

Identifiers
- Aliases: MEP1A, PPHA, meprin A subunit alpha
- External IDs: OMIM: 600388; MGI: 96963; GeneCards: MEP1A
Available structures
PDB	Ortholog search: PDBe RCSB
PDB	List of PDB id codes 1IAF
Enzyme activity
EC #	BRENDA	ExPASy	KEGG	MetaCyc
3.4.24.18	↗	↗	↗	↗

Gene location (Human)
Chr.	Chromosome 6 (human)
Band	6p12.3	Start	46,793,389 bp
Band	6p12.3	End	46,839,778 bp

Gene location (Mouse)
Chr.	Chromosome 17 (mouse)
Band	17 B3|17 19.73 cM	Start	43,785,215 bp
Band	17 B3|17 19.73 cM	End	43,813,703 bp
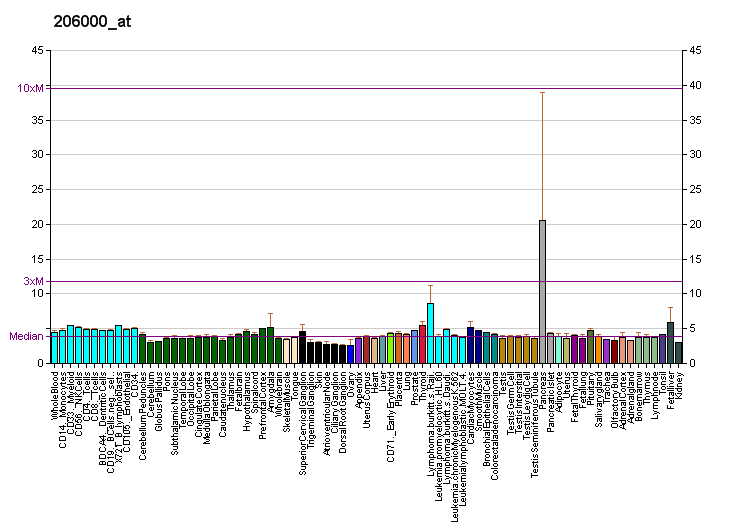
RNA expression pattern
Bgee	Human / Mouse (ortholog); Top expressed in: mucosa of ileum; jejunal mucosa; mucosa of colon; mucosa of sigmoid colon; rectum; mucosa of transverse colon; duodenum; testicle; appendix; amniotic fluid / Top expressed in: right kidney; ileum; proximal tubule; human kidney; intestinal villus; epithelium of small intestine; left colon; jejunum; renal pelvis; migratory enteric neural crest cell; More reference expression data
BioGPS	More reference expression data
Gene ontology
Molecular function	zinc ion binding; peptidase activity; metalloendopeptidase activity; protein binding; hydrolase activity; metallopeptidase activity; metal ion binding
Cellular component	integral component of membrane; meprin A complex; integral component of plasma membrane; extracellular exosome; membrane; extracellular space
Biological process	digestion; proteolysis
Sources:Amigo / QuickGO
Orthologs
Databases	NCBI: entry; OMA: entry
Species	Human	Mouse
Entrez	4224	17287
Ensembl	ENSG00000112818	ENSMUSG00000023914
UniProt	Q16819	P28825
RefSeq (mRNA)	NM_005588	NM_008585
RefSeq (protein)	NP_005579	NP_032611
Location (UCSC)	Chr 6: 46.79 – 46.84 Mb	Chr 17: 43.79 – 43.81 Mb
PubMed search
- Wikidata
View/Edit Human	View/Edit Mouse

Meprin A subunit alpha also known as endopeptidase-2 or PABA peptide hydrolase is the alpha subunit of the meprin A enzyme that in humans is encoded by the MEP1A gene. The MEP1A locus is on chromosome 6p in humans and on chromosome 17 in mice.

== Function ==
The meprin alpha subunit product of the MEP1A gene is processed in the endoplasmic reticulum during intracellular transport, and is secreted as homomeric meprin A. Meprin alpha subunits may self-associate, and once secreted, form very large multimers, with a molecular mass of over 1 million daltons. In cells concurrently expressing MEP1B, the meprin alpha and meprin beta subunits form disulfide dimers that interact to form membrane bound heterotetrameric meprin A.
