= Envonalkib =

Medication

Clinical data
- Drug class: Antineoplastic
- ATC code: None

Legal status
- Legal status: CN: Rx-only

Identifiers
- IUPAC name: 3-[(1R)-1-(2,6-Dichloro-3-fluorophenyl)ethoxy]-5-[4-methoxy-6-[(2S)-2-methylpiperazin-1-yl]-3-pyridinyl]pyridin-2-amine
- CAS Number: 1621519-26-3
- PubChem CID: 76899983
- ChemSpider: 115010418
- UNII: QB7KTQ7VW9
- ChEMBL: ChEMBL5095063

Chemical and physical data
- Formula: C_{24}H_{26}Cl_{2}FN_{5}O_{2}
- Molar mass: 506.40 g·mol^{−1}
- 3D model (JSmol): Interactive image
- SMILES: C[C@H]1CNCCN1C2=NC=C(C(=C2)OC)C3=CC(=C(N=C3)N)O[C@H](C)C4=C(C=CC(=C4Cl)F)Cl
- InChI: InChI=1S/C24H26Cl2FN5O2/c1-13-10-29-6-7-32(13)21-9-19(33-3)16(12-30-21)15-8-20(24(28)31-11-15)34-14(2)22-17(25)4-5-18(27)23(22)26/h4-5,8-9,11-14,29H,6-7,10H2,1-3H3,(H2,28,31)/t13-,14+/m0/s1; Key:BVGDAZBTIVRTGO-UONOGXRCSA-N

Envonalkib is a pharmaceutical drug for cancer treatment. It belongs to the class of anaplastic lymphoma kinase inhibitors (ALK inhibitors).

In China, it is approved for the treatment of patients with ALK-positive locally advanced or metastatic non-small cell lung cancer (NSCLC) who have not received treatment with ALK inhibitors.
