= Plasma cell granuloma =

Non-neoplastic lesions of unknown etiology

Plasma cell granulomas (PCGs) are uncommon, non-neoplastic lesions of unknown etiology and are considered an entity of IgG4-related diseases.

== History/Introduction ==
PCGs were first discovered and described in 1973 by Bahadori and Liebow. PCGs are characterized by the proliferation and infiltration of different inflammatory cells with the main cell observed in highest concentrations being plasma cells. More specifically, PCGs are a type of mass-forming lesion arising from the accumulation of polyclonal plasma cells surrounded in a swirling storiform orientation of fibrosis and spindle cell proliferation. It has been noted that these granulomas have the propensity to manifest on any organ or soft tissue. Plasma cell granulomas are generally found to be benign, but in some cases, the granulomas have the ability to initiate malignancy and become symptomatic regardless of location or size. Common sites of plasma cell granulomas are in the oral gingiva, lungs, vagina, larynx, orbit, spinal cord meninges, breast, pelvic soft tissue, bladder, mesentery, retroperitoneum, kidney, lymph nodes, spleen, pancreas, liver, stomach, heart, thyroid, and trachea. Microscopically, plasma cell granulomas, demonstrate a lesional pattern of inflammatory pseudotumor. The term inflammatory pseudotumor has previously been used to classify plasma cell granulomas. However, this term has become more uncommon in recent years due to its lack of specificity. Today, scientist use more up to date diagnostic and medical terminology to avoid classifying lesions in the same group that are likely to have different etiologies. Other names associated with plasma cell granulomas are inflammatory myofibroblastic tumor, inflammatory myofibrohistiocytic tumor, benign myofibroblastoma, pseudosarcoma, fibrous histocytoma, fibroxanthoma, xanthomatous pseudotumor, xanthogranuloma, myxoid hamartoma, and lymphoid hamartoma.

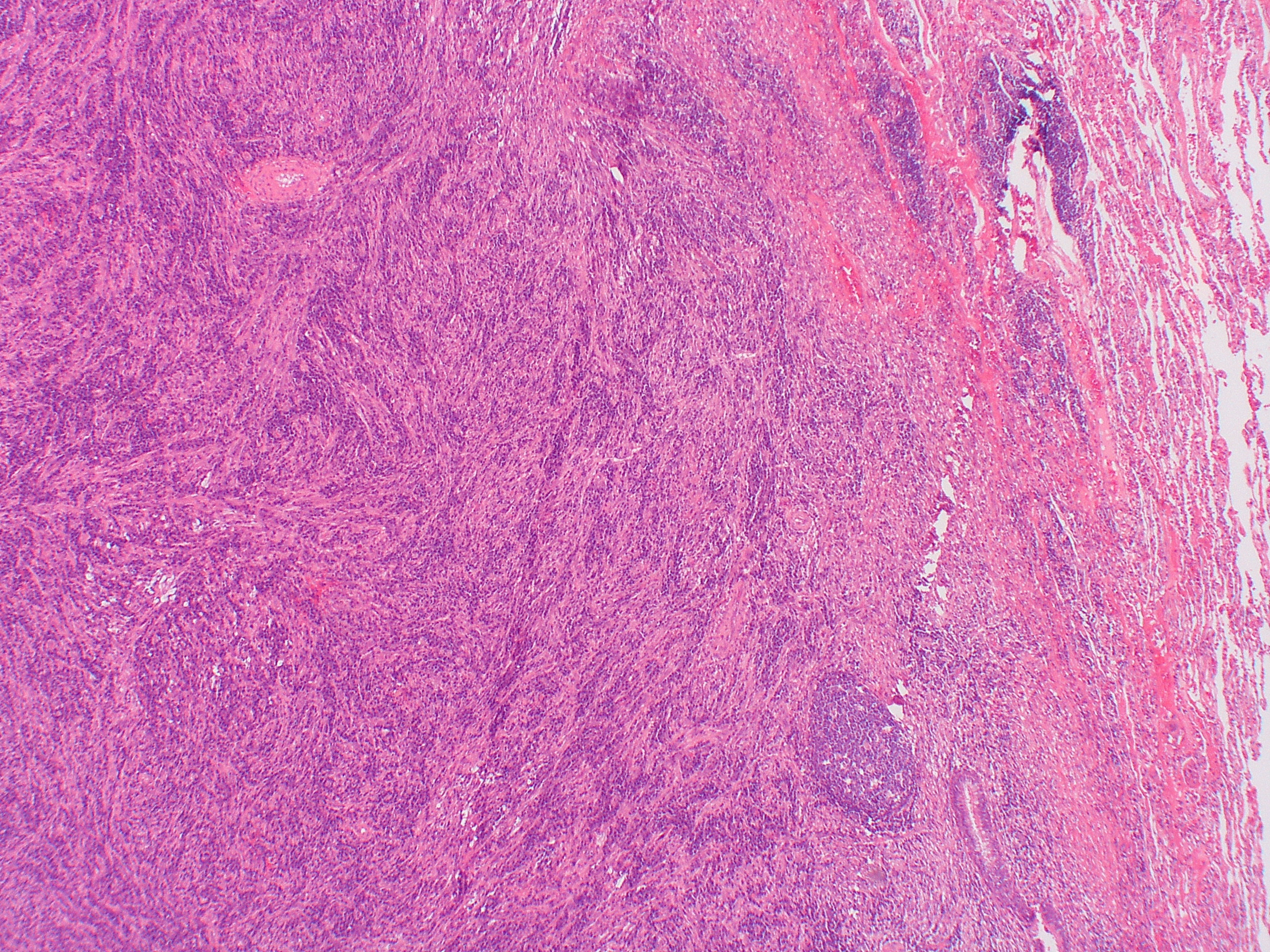
General image of plasma cell granuloma that was classified in a broader category of inflammatory pseudotumor. Original author of image was: Yale Rosen from USA

== Etiology ==
The etiology of plasma cell granulomas is widely unknown, however, there are a few ideas on what causes the condition to develop. Studies suggest that one possible causative factor is the presence of a foreign body. A foreign body is likely to give off an antigenic cue causing the accumulation of polyclonal IgG4 positive plasma cells. Others suggest that plasma cell granulomas have an autoimmune origin. PCGs have also been found to be drug and/or hormone induced.

== Pathology ==
=== Diagnosis/Differentiation ===
Since plasma cell granulomas have the ability to occur at any site, even though they are uncommon, it should be included in differential diagnostics in regard to plasma cell neoplasms. With granulomas that arise in the mouth, PCGs are commonly misclassified considering the malignancy of the disease due to its aggressive behavior and clinical presentation. Plasma cell granulomas located in the oral cavity have been identified with disruption and damage of surrounding tissues. In comparison, PCGs manifesting in other internal organs are usually secondary findings on radiographic images. Occasionally, plasma cell granulomas are misdiagnosed as malignant lymphoma or malignant plasmacytoma during initial examination due to radiological evidence of its ability to erode and infiltrate bone. Typically, under microscopic analysis, a plasma cell granuloma will display a dense population of morphologically similar plasma cells sporadically mixed together with other inflammatory lymphocytes seen in a storiform orientation of fibrotic connective tissue. To avoid the misdiagnosis of a PCG as a plasmacytoma, it should be noted PCGs are formed from typical plasma cells while plasmacytomas consist of both atypical and typical plasma cells. It is imperative that such differentiation between plasma cell granuloma and plasmacytomas are completed prior to informing the patient undergoing clinical examination. The importance of an accurate diagnosis between the two is due to the different prognosis and progression of the mass-forming lesions. While plasma cell granulomas are often found to be benign, plasmacytomas have been associated with a more aggressive and invasive behavior in which they have the ability to transform or evolve into multiple myeloma. One of the most reliable distinguishing factors from plasmacytomas and plasma cell granulomas, is the polyclonality of the plasma cells involved with plasma cell granulomas. PCGs that manifest in the mouth, specifically the gingiva, have been seen to exhibit similar physical characteristics of other conditions such as epulis, fibroma, pyogenic granuloma, and peripheral giant cell granuloma. Histopathological analysis of plasma cell granulomas have been found to be the most precise confirmative diagnosis to distinguish PCGs from other lesional tumors of plasma cell origins.

=== Histopathology ===
Analyzing the changes that arise in the tissue associated with the mass-forming lesion has been found to be the most accurate and precise method for confirming the diagnosis of plasma cell granulomas. This can be achieved by taking excision biopsies of the unknown mass for examination. Typically, plasma cell granulomas appear microscopically as a lesional mass consisting of an abundance of plasma cells intermingled among different inflammatory cells set in fibrous connective tissue displayed in a spiral appearance. Depending on the location of the plasma cell granuloma, vasculitis can be present but is not considered a confirmatory factor for diagnosis. Kappa/lambda in-situ hybridization is another diagnostic test that needs to be done when trying to characterize the lesion for further confirmation. Common results associated with kappa/lambda in-situ hybridization studies of PCGs are an abundant population of CD138 positive polyclonal plasma cells. If instead, results show monoclonality of plasma cells it is indicative of plasmacytoma.

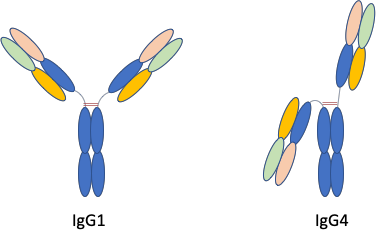
Blech et al. – Biophysical J 2019 116 1637: "Structure of a Therapeutic Full-Length Anti-NPRA IgG4 Antibody: Dissecting Conformational Diversity" were describing that IgG4 has an unusual preferred configuration that is different to the classical Y-shape described for many other antibodies. See there for details.

=== Determining Plasma Cell Clonality ===
The clonality of plasma cells is most accurately determined by two different methods. One method is flow cytometry and the other is kappa/lambda in-situ hybridization and/or immunohistochemical staining (IHC). To obtain the most precise results of clonality it is recommended that both methods be used. Flow cytometry is generally carried out with plasma cell granulomas to obtain the ratio of kappa light chains to lambda light chains. Immunohistochemical staining of plasma cell granulomas is an important diagnostic method to show PCG lesions are also an entity within the IgG4-related diseases. IHC staining is especially helpful because it allows for the assessment of the quantitative number of IgG4 positive plasma cells. Immunohistochemical staining will also provide the overall ratio of IgG4 secreting plasma cells to the total number of IgG secreting plasma cells within a given mass. Plasma cell granulomas have been characterized showing a ratio of IgG4:IgG of greater than 40 percent. A ratio above 40 percent indicates abnormal elevated levels of IgG4 positive plasma cells. Even though IgG levels can be measured in serum, histopathological analysis has been concluded to be the most accurate characterization method of PCG lesions. Using serum IgG4 levels can be a misleading diagnostic, considering that up to 40 percent of patients diagnosed with plasma cell granuloma have IgG4 serum levels within normal reference ranges.

== Treatment for PCG ==
The typical treatment for plasma cell granuloma is a complete surgical excision of the lesional mass. Generally when the mass is removed, patients will display an absolute reversal of symptoms. When surgical removal of the granuloma is not applicable due to size or location, the lesions have been found to respond well to radiation therapy as well as glucocorticoids or steroids. While recurrence rate for plasma cell granulomas is very low, they have been reported; therefore, it is recommended that patients come back for yearly follow up visits.

== Localization ==
- Oral gingiva, lungs, vagina, larynx, orbit, spinal cord meninges, breast, pelvic soft tissue, bladder, mesentery, retroperitoneum, kidney, lymph nodes, spleen, pancreas, liver, stomach, heart, thyroid, and trachea.

== See also ==
- Pulmonary hyalinizing granuloma
