= Inflammatory myeloblastic tumor =

Inflammatory myeloblastic tumor (IMT), also known as an "inflammatory pseudotumor", is a rare benign tumor occurring in the liver and/or bile ducts.
