= Zonadhesin =

Protein-coding gene in the species Homo sapiens

ZAN

Identifiers
- Aliases: ZAN, zonadhesin (gene/pseudogene), zonadhesin
- External IDs: OMIM: 602372; MGI: 106656; HomoloGene: 124417; GeneCards: ZAN; OMA:ZAN - orthologs

Gene location (Human)
Chr.	Chromosome 7 (human)
Band	7q22.1	Start	100,733,595 bp
Band	7q22.1	End	100,797,797 bp

Gene location (Mouse)
Chr.	Chromosome 5 (mouse)
Band	5 G2|5 76.4 cM	Start	137,378,637 bp
Band	5 G2|5 76.4 cM	End	137,477,064 bp
RNA expression pattern
Bgee	Human / Mouse (ortholog); Top expressed in: left testis; right testis; right lobe of liver / Top expressed in: Ileal epithelium; embryo; entorhinal cortex; spermatid; perirhinal cortex; embryo; neural layer of retina; left colon; choroid plexus of fourth ventricle; CA3 field; More reference expression data
BioGPS	n/a
Orthologs
Species	Human	Mouse
Entrez	7455	22635
Ensembl	ENSG00000146839	ENSMUSG00000079173
UniProt	Q9Y493	O88799
RefSeq (mRNA)	NM_003386; NM_173055; NM_173056; NM_173057; NM_173058 NM_173059	NM_011741
RefSeq (protein)	NP_003377; NP_775082	n/a
Location (UCSC)	Chr 7: 100.73 – 100.8 Mb	Chr 5: 137.38 – 137.48 Mb
PubMed search
- Wikidata
View/Edit Human	View/Edit Mouse

Zonadhesin is a protein that in humans is encoded by the ZAN gene.

== Function ==
This gene encodes a protein that functions in the species specificity of sperm adhesion to the egg zona pellucida. The encoded protein is located in the acrosome and may be involved in signaling or gamete recognition.

An allelic polymorphism in this gene results in both functional and frameshifted alleles; the reference genome represents the functional allele. Alternative splicing of this gene results in multiple transcript variants. [provided by RefSeq, Jul 2015].
