= Papillary adenocarcinoma of the lung =

Papillary adenocarcinoma of the lung is a histological form of lung cancer that is diagnosed when the malignant cells of the tumor form complex papillary structures and exhibit compressive, destructive growth that replaces the normal lung tissue. It accounts for about 7.4%-12% of all lung adenocarcinomas. Due to its rare occurrence, current literature typically consists only of small case series or case studies. The distinct histological pattern of papillary adenocarcinoma proves importance in diagnostics as it has been shown to represent a relatively more aggressive form of adenocarcinoma with a potentially poorer prognostic indication.

== Background ==
Adenocarcinoma of the lung is the most common subtype of lung cancer within the United States. It comprises about 40% of all lung cancers. Under invasive adenocarcinoma, there are multiple subtype classifications including lepidic, acinar, papillary, solid, and micropapillary. Papillary adenocarcinoma is a distinctly rare subtype with specific features that define it which become important in diagnosis and treatment. It accounts for about 7.4%-12% of all lung adenocarcinomas. It used to be thought that papillary and bronchioloalveolar carcinoma were the same at their basic histological pattern, but the current literature and the World Health Organization (WHO) now acknowledges papillary adenocarcinoma as its own invasive adenocarcinoma subtype with a distinct clinicopathologic course with potentially greater morbidity and mortality than bronchioloalveolar carcinoma.

== Risk factors ==
About 85% of lung cancer cases are attributed to individuals who currently smoke or have a history of smoking. Smoking is noted to be the number one risk factors for lung cancer in general, specifically adenocarcinoma of the lung; however, papillary adenocarcinoma has been shown to be common in nonsmokers. Several additional factors have been linked to an increased susceptibility to lung cancer, including environmental exposures, family history, genetic predisposition, and prior lung inflammation or inflammatory disorders such as COPD, emphysema, and asthma. Although smoking still remains the number one risk factor for lung cancer development, papillary adenocarcinoma has been reported with greater frequency among nonsmoking populations than potentially other forms for lung cancer, suggesting that factors such as genetic predisposition or other epidemiological factors may play a more significant role in the pathogenesis of this subtype of lung cancer. A recent study identified higher rates of KEAP1 gene mutations in papillary adenocarcinoma, highlighting its important role in the KEAP1–NRF2 pathway, which regulates antioxidant responses, enzyme detoxification, and drug transporter activity. The authors propose that the increased prevalence of this specific mutation may help explain the poorer prognosis and greater resistance to chemotherapy observed in papillary adenocarcinoma compared with other forms of lung cancer.

== Signs and symptoms ==
Lung cancer may be diagnosed at any stage of development, and although symptoms can present in earlier stages, their prevalence generally increases with disease progression; however, it has been noted that fewer than 50% of patients with stage IV disease present with only one or two symptoms at the time of diagnosis. The most common symptoms on presentation prior to diagnosis of lung cancer are typically dyspnea, cough, and chest pain. The American Cancer Society reports that most lung cancers do not manifest clinically until metastasis has occurred; however, this does not preclude the presence of symptoms in a subset of patients at earlier stages. They note that common presenting signs and symptoms include cough, hemoptysis, chest pain exacerbated by deep inspiration, laughter, or coughing, hoarseness, loss of appetite, unexplained weight loss, dyspnea, fatigue, recurrent pulmonary infections, and new-onset wheezing.

== Diagnosis ==
Diagnostic workup will typically start with radiologic imaging of the lung tissue. Radiologically, lesions typically present as an indistinct pulmonary nodule. The diagnosis of papillary adenocarcinoma is confirmed through surgical biopsy of lung tissue typically demonstrating papillary structures that disrupt and replace the normal architecture of the lung comprising greater than 75% of the tumor, although this is not a set diagnostic criteria parameter. One study notes that the cytologic distinction between papillary adenocarcinoma and the similar bronchioloalveolar carcinoma is the presence of nuclear pleomorphism and nuclear rim abnormalities with prominent nucleoli. This study also showed papillary adenocarcinoma lesions to be on average larger at diagnosis with a higher rate of invasive metastases and lymph node involvement.

== Treatment ==
Treatment strategies are determined by the characteristics of the primary lesion, as well as additional factors such as the presence of metastasis, which will contribute to the stage of disease at diagnosis. Forms of treatment for lung cancer in general include surgery, radiation therapy, chemotherapy, and targeted therapy.

== Prognosis ==
The distinct histological pattern of papillary adenocarcinoma proves importance in diagnostics as it has been shown to represent a relatively more aggressive form of adenocarcinoma with a potentially poorer prognostic indication. One study reports that the 5-year survival probabilities of 39% and 22% for stage I and stage II papillary adenocarcinoma are similar to those of conventional lung adenocarcinoma but are markedly worse than the 38%–90% survival probabilities observed for comparable stages of bronchioloalveolar carcinoma. Recent studies of conventional adenocarcinoma suggest that the presence of 25–75% papillary tumor components may be associated with a more unfavorable prognosis; however, this relationship has not been clearly established.

== Sources ==
- Roth, Jack A.; Hong, Waun Ki; Komaki, Ritsuko U.; Tsao, Anne S.; Chang, Joe Y.; Blackmon, Shanda H., eds. (2014). Lung Cancer. doi:10.1002/9781118468791. ISBN 978-1-118-46874-6.
