= Pulmonary hyalinizing granuloma =

Pulmonary hyalinizing granuloma is a lesional pattern of pulmonary inflammatory pseudotumor.

== Pathology ==
Pulmonary hyalinizing granuloma is characterized by localized changes in lung architecture determined by deposition of hyaline collagenous fibrosis accompanied by sparse lymphocytic infiltrate that compresses and distorts the remaining bronchioles. A higher magnification, the mass is composed by hypocellular collagen lamellae.

== Associations ==
- Morvan Syndrome
- HIV/AIDS
- Posterior uveitis
- Castleman's disease
