= ALKAL1 =

Protein-coding gene in humans

Identifiers
- Aliases: ALKAL1, UNQ9433, FAM150A, family with sequence similarity 150 member A, ALK and LTK ligand 1, AUGB, AUGA
- External IDs: MGI: 3645495; GeneCards: ALKAL1

Gene location (Human)
Chr.	Chromosome 8 (human)
Band	8q11.23	Start	52,534,037 bp
Band	8q11.23	End	52,565,430 bp

Gene location (Mouse)
Chr.	Chromosome 1 (mouse)
Band	1|1 A1	Start	6,429,442 bp
Band	1|1 A1	End	6,464,955 bp
RNA expression pattern
Bgee	Human / Mouse (ortholog); Top expressed in: testicle; gonad; gallbladder; left lobe of thyroid gland; right lobe of thyroid gland; duodenum; urinary bladder; minor salivary glands; right lung; olfactory zone of nasal mucosa / Top expressed in: embryo; embryo; lung; olfactory bulb; stomach; colon; More reference expression data
BioGPS	n/a
Gene ontology
Molecular function	protein binding; receptor signaling protein tyrosine kinase activator activity; receptor tyrosine kinase binding
Cellular component	extracellular region
Biological process	positive regulation of protein tyrosine kinase activity; positive regulation of ERK1 and ERK2 cascade; positive regulation of ERK5 cascade; positive regulation of neuron projection development
Sources:Amigo / QuickGO
Orthologs
Databases	NCBI: entry; OMA: entry
Species	Human	Mouse
Entrez	389658	620393
Ensembl	ENSG00000196711	ENSMUSG00000087247
UniProt	Q6UXT8	J3QPP8
RefSeq (mRNA)	NM_207413	NM_001195732
RefSeq (protein)	NP_997296	NP_001182661
Location (UCSC)	Chr 8: 52.53 – 52.57 Mb	Chr 1: 6.43 – 6.46 Mb
PubMed search
- Wikidata
View/Edit Human	View/Edit Mouse

ALKAL1, also known as ALK and LTK ligand 1, is a secreted ligand that in humans is encoded by the ALKAL1 gene. ALKAL1 participates in receptor tyrosine kinase signaling pathways, and supports receptor-mediated signaling initiation.
