= Meprin A =

Identifiers
- EC no.: 3.4.24.18
- CAS no.: 148938-24-3

Databases
- IntEnz: IntEnz view
- BRENDA: BRENDA entry
- ExPASy: NiceZyme view
- KEGG: KEGG entry
- MetaCyc: metabolic pathway
- PRIAM: profile
- PDB structures: RCSB PDB PDBe PDBsum
- Gene Ontology: AmiGO / QuickGO
Search
- PMC: articles
- PubMed: articles
- NCBI: proteins

Meprin A

Identifiers
- Symbol: Meprin
- InterPro: IPR008294
- Membranome: 537

Meprin A (EC 3.4.24.18, endopeptidase-2, meprin-a, meprin, N-benzoyl-L-tyrosyl-p-aminobenzoic acid hydrolase, PABA-peptide hydrolase, PPH) is an enzyme that cleaves protein and peptide substrates preferentially on carboxyl side of hydrophobic residues. This metalloprotease can be associated with inflammatory responses. It can be found in the extracellular space where it can also form complex structures by joining its monomers together.

Meprin A is a dimer composed of the products transcribed from the following two genes:

meprin A, alpha

Identifiers
- Symbol: MEP1A
- NCBI gene: 4224
- HGNC: 7015
- OMIM: 600388
- RefSeq: NM_005588
- UniProt: Q16819

Other data
- EC number: 3.4.24.18
- Locus: Chr. 6 p12-p11
Search for
- Structures: Swiss-model
- Domains: InterPro

meprin A, beta

Identifiers
- Symbol: MEP1B
- NCBI gene: 4225
- HGNC: 7020
- OMIM: 600389
- RefSeq: NM_005925
- UniProt: Q16820

Other data
- EC number: 3.4.24.18
- Locus: Chr. 18 q12.2-12.3
Search for
- Structures: Swiss-model
- Domains: InterPro
