= MEP1B =

Protein-coding gene in the species Homo sapiens

Identifiers
- Aliases: MEP1B, meprin A subunit beta
- External IDs: OMIM: 600389; MGI: 96964; GeneCards: MEP1B
Available structures
PDB	Ortholog search: PDBe RCSB
PDB	List of PDB id codes 4GWM, 4GWN
Enzyme activity
EC #	BRENDA	ExPASy	KEGG	MetaCyc
3.4.24.63	↗	↗	↗	↗

Gene location (Human)
Chr.	Chromosome 18 (human)
Band	18q12.1	Start	32,185,069 bp
Band	18q12.1	End	32,220,404 bp

Gene location (Mouse)
Chr.	Chromosome 18 (mouse)
Band	18 A2|18 11.81 cM	Start	21,194,980 bp
Band	18 A2|18 11.81 cM	End	21,233,256 bp
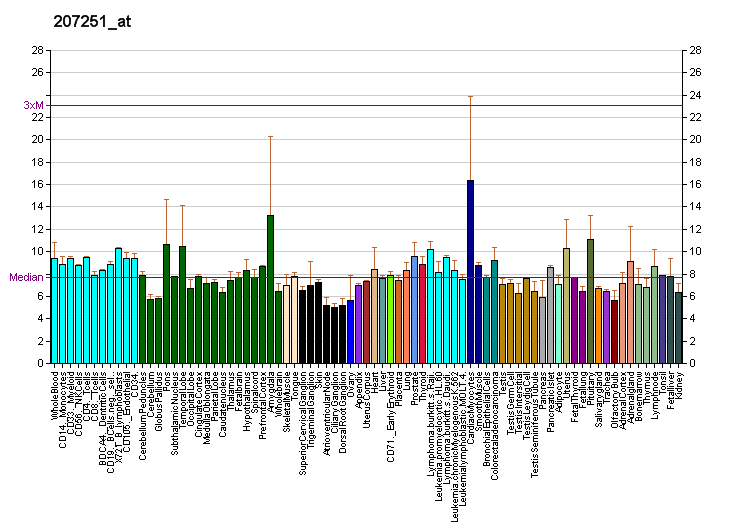
RNA expression pattern
Bgee	Human / Mouse (ortholog); Top expressed in: jejunal mucosa; mucosa of ileum; duodenum; mucosa of transverse colon; gonad; testicle; rectum; gastric mucosa; islet of Langerhans; smooth muscle tissue / Top expressed in: ileum; jejunum; right kidney; duodenum; intestinal epithelium; human kidney; large intestine; colon; proximal tubule; Paneth cell; More reference expression data
BioGPS	More reference expression data
Gene ontology
Molecular function	peptidase activity; metalloendopeptidase activity; protein binding; metallopeptidase activity; hydrolase activity; metal ion binding; identical protein binding; zinc ion binding
Cellular component	integral component of membrane; extracellular region; membrane; plasma membrane; integral component of plasma membrane; meprin A complex
Biological process	inflammatory response; toxin transport; proteolysis
Sources:Amigo / QuickGO
Orthologs
Databases	NCBI: entry; OMA: entry
Species	Human	Mouse
Entrez	4225	17288
Ensembl	ENSG00000141434	ENSMUSG00000024313
UniProt	Q16820	Q61847
RefSeq (mRNA)	NM_001308171; NM_005925	NM_008586
RefSeq (protein)	NP_001295100; NP_005916	NP_032612
Location (UCSC)	Chr 18: 32.19 – 32.22 Mb	Chr 18: 21.19 – 21.23 Mb
PubMed search
- Wikidata
View/Edit Human	View/Edit Mouse

Meprin A subunit beta is a protein that in humans is encoded by the MEP1B gene.

Meprins are multidomain zinc metalloproteases that are highly expressed in mammalian kidney and intestinal brush border membranes and in leukocytes and certain cancer cells. Mature meprins are oligomers of evolutionarily related, separately encoded alpha and/or beta subunits. Homooligomers of meprin-alpha (MEP1A; MIM 600388) are secreted; oligomers containing meprin-beta are associated with the plasma membrane. Substrates include bioactive peptides and extracellular matrix proteins. See MIM 600388 for further information on meprins.[supplied by OMIM]
