= EML4 =

Protein-coding gene in the species Homo sapiens

Identifiers
- Aliases: EML4, C2orf2, ELP120, EMAP-4, EMAPL4, ROPP120, echinoderm microtubule associated protein like 4, EMAP like 4
- External IDs: OMIM: 607442; MGI: 1926048; GeneCards: EML4
Available structures
PDB	Ortholog search: PDBe RCSB
PDB	List of PDB id codes 4CGC

Gene location (Human)
Chr.	Chromosome 2 (human)
Band	2p21	Start	42,169,353 bp
Band	2p21	End	42,332,548 bp

Gene location (Mouse)
Chr.	Chromosome 17 (mouse)
Band	17|17 E4	Start	83,658,360 bp
Band	17|17 E4	End	83,787,790 bp
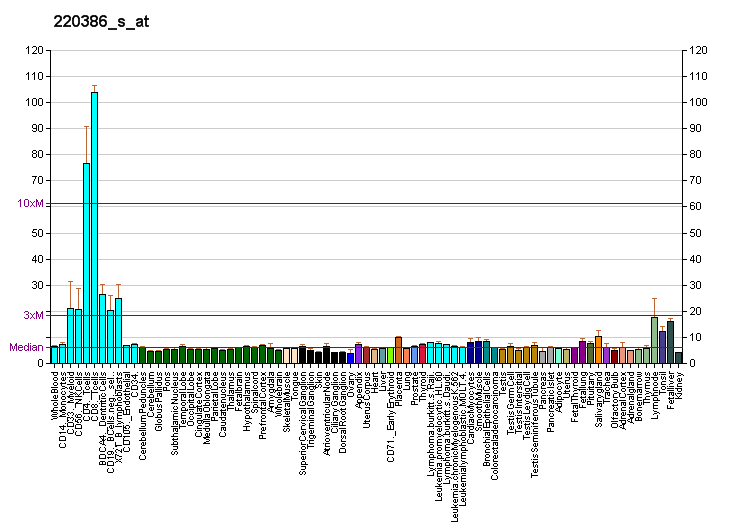
RNA expression pattern
Bgee	Human / Mouse (ortholog); Top expressed in: tibia; jejunal mucosa; visceral pleura; tonsil; mucosa of sigmoid colon; epithelium of nasopharynx; duodenum; rectum; pylorus; mucosa of paranasal sinus / Top expressed in: hand; maxillary prominence; mandibular prominence; molar; primitive streak; abdominal wall; Gonadal ridge; secondary oocyte; migratory enteric neural crest cell; renal corpuscle; More reference expression data
BioGPS	More reference expression data
Gene ontology
Molecular function	microtubule binding; molecular function
Cellular component	cytoplasm; microtubule; cytoskeleton; membrane; microtubule cytoskeleton; mitotic spindle
Biological process	microtubule-based process; mitotic cell cycle; microtubule cytoskeleton organization
Sources:Amigo / QuickGO
Orthologs
Databases	NCBI: entry; OMA: entry
Species	Human	Mouse
Entrez	27436	78798
Ensembl	ENSG00000143924	ENSMUSG00000032624
UniProt	Q9HC35	Q3UMY5
RefSeq (mRNA)	NM_001145076; NM_019063	NM_001114361; NM_001114362; NM_001286567; NM_199466; NM_001357886 NM_001379373; NM_001379374
RefSeq (protein)	NP_001138548; NP_061936	NP_001107833; NP_001107834; NP_001273496; NP_955760; NP_001344815 NP_001366302; NP_001366303
Location (UCSC)	Chr 2: 42.17 – 42.33 Mb	Chr 17: 83.66 – 83.79 Mb
PubMed search
- Wikidata
View/Edit Human	View/Edit Mouse

Echinoderm microtubule-associated protein-like 4 is a protein that in humans is encoded by the EML4 gene.

This protein is involved in cancers when spliced with the anaplastic lymphoma kinase.
