= GP-100 =

GP-100 can refer to

- A model of Suzuki motorcycle

The Japanese vintage motorcycle Suzuki GP 100 U is not described fully. A separate page should be created for this particular motor cycle which became popular due to 1980's Grand Prix (GP) motor cycle races.

- Ruger GP100, an American revolver
- glycoprotein 100, a melanoma antigen
- Gp100:209-217(210M), a peptide cancer vaccine.
