= SillaJen =

SillaJen, Inc.
- Native name: 신라젠
- Formerly: Jennerex, Inc
- Type: Public
- Traded as: KOSDAQ: 215600
- Industry: Biopharmaceuticals
- Founded: 2003
- Headquarters: Busan, South Korea
- Number of locations: 4 (South Korea, USA)
- Area served: Worldwide
- Key people: SillaJen, Inc: Eun-Sang Moon (Chairman, President, and CEO) Myung-Suk Song (CFO), Hyun-Pil Shin (Chief Strategy Officer) SillaJen, Biotherapeutics: Helena H. Chaye(CBO), Georg Roth (COO), James M. Burke(CMO)
- Products: Pexa-Vec (JX-594)
- Number of employees: ~100
- Subsidiaries: SillaJen Biotherapeutics Inc.
- Website: www.sillajen.com

SillaJen, Inc. is a South Korean-based biotechnology company, with offices in Busan, Yangsan and Seoul, South Korea, and San Francisco, California.

== Technology ==
Pexa-Vec (JX-594) was developed using the SOLVE (Selective Oncolytic Vaccinia Engineering) platform. This platform may be used to optimize virus targeting to specific cancer types, to select transgenes to include into the viral genome, and to optimize viral infection and/or replication selectively through targeted mutations.

JX-900 (VVDD): VVDD Platform: Next-gen enhanced oncolytic immunotherapy.

== Clinical trials ==
=== Pexa-Vec (JX-594) ===
As of June 2018, these are the clinical trials investigating Pexa-Vec.

| Indication | Phase | Status | Notes | Sponsor | Ref |
|---|---|---|---|---|---|
| Hepatocellular carcinoma | III | Recruiting | Combined with sorafenib | SillaJen | NCT02562755 |
| Solid Tumors | II | Recruiting | Combined with metronomic cyclophosphamide | Investigator | NCT02630368 |
| Renal Cell Carcinoma 2L | I | Recruiting | Combined with REGN2810 | SillaJen | NCT03294083 |
| Colorectal Cancer 2L/3L | I | Recruiting | Combined with PD-L1(durvalumab) and CTLA4(tremelimumab) | Investigator | NCT03206073 |
| Liver Cancer | I | Recruiting | Combined with Nivolumab | Transgene SA | NCT03071094 |
| Solid Tumors | I | Recruiting | Combined with Ipilimumab | Investigator | NCT02977156 |

== Partnerships ==
SillaJen has partnered with Transgene, Green Cross, and Lee's Pharmaceuticals and clinical collaboration agreements with Regeneron Pharmaceuticals and the US National Cancer Institute for JX-594.

== History ==
2003. Jennerex, Inc. (San Francisco, USA) was established.

2014. SillaJen acquires Jennerex, Inc.

2015. In April 2015. SillaJen began a Phase 3 clinical trial of Pexa-Vec in advanced liver cancer.

2015. In October 2015, SillaJen is selected as the major developer for the Government project of “Global State-of-the-art technology development for biomedical products."

2016. In January 2016, SillaJen announces first patient randomized in its global Phase 3 trial for Pexa-Vec in Advanced Liver Cancer. In December 2016. SillaJen is listed on KOSDAQ market in South Korea.

2017. In May 2017, SillaJen signs a clinical collaborative agreement with Regeneron Pharmaceuticals to conduct a combination study with Pexa-Vec and Regeneron's immune checkpoint inhibitor cemiplimab for renal cell carcinoma.

In July 2017, SillaJen received approval from the China CFDA to commence phase 3 clinical trial for Pexa-Vec in liver cancer.

In Aug 2017, SillaJen signs a cooperative research and development agreement (CRADA or CRDA) with the National Cancer Institute to conduct a clinical study in combination with Pexa-Vec and AstraZeneca's checkpoint inhibitors durvalumab and tremelimumab.
