= Adenocarcinoma of the lung =

Lung cancer of glandular origin or characteristics

- Other names: Pulmonary adenocarcinoma
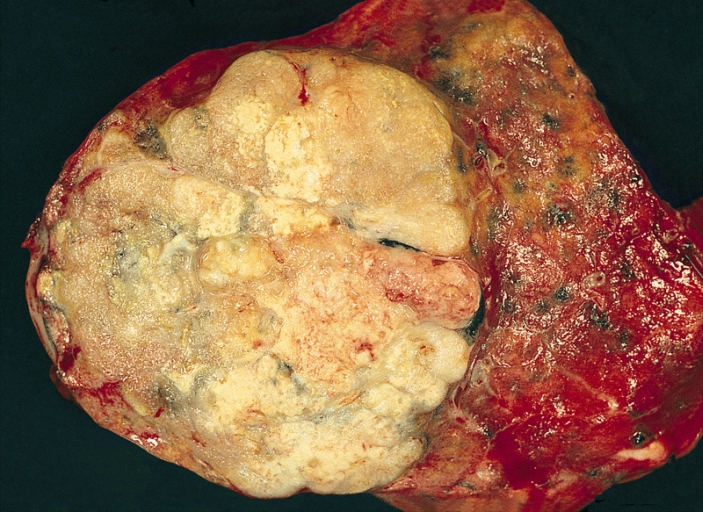
- A gross pathological specimen of a pulmonary adenocarcinoma, removed in a lobectomy
- Specialty: Oncology

Adenocarcinoma of the lung is the most common type of lung cancer, and like other forms of lung cancer, it is characterized by distinct cellular and molecular features. It is classified as one of several non-small cell lung cancers (NSCLC), to distinguish it from small cell lung cancer which has a different behavior and prognosis. Lung adenocarcinoma is further classified into several subtypes and variants. The signs and symptoms of this specific type of lung cancer are similar to other forms of lung cancer, and patients most commonly complain of persistent cough and shortness of breath.

Adenocarcinoma is more common in patients with a history of cigarette smoking, and is the most common form of lung cancer in younger women and Asian populations. The pathophysiology of adenocarcinoma is complicated, but generally follows a histologic progression from cells found in healthy lungs to distinctly dysmorphic, or irregular cells. There are several distinct molecular and genetic pathways that contribute to this progression. Like many lung cancers, adenocarcinoma of the lung is often advanced by the time of diagnosis. Once a lesion or tumor is identified with various imaging modalities, such as computed tomography (CT) or X-ray, a biopsy is required to confirm the diagnosis.

Treatment of this lung cancer is based upon the specific subtype and the extent of spread from the primary tumor. Surgical resection, chemotherapy, radiotherapy, targeted therapy and immunotherapy are used in attempt to eradicate the cancerous cells based upon these factors.

== Signs and symptoms ==
The majority of patients who are diagnosed with lung cancer usually present with locally advanced or metastatic disease. Only about one third of patients have stage I disease when diagnosed. The symptoms that the patient exhibits usually reflect the extent of the cancer's spread. Lung cancers that are discovered early may cause symptoms localized to the respiratory system. However, lung cancer that is advanced will cause patients to experience additional signs and symptoms secondary to the cancer spreading to other organ systems. In order of highest frequency, the most common signs of lung cancer include:

- Cough that does not go away or gets worse
- Weight loss
- Dyspnea (shortness of breath or difficulty breathing)
- Chest pain, which may be aggravated by deep breathing, coughing, or laughing
- Hemoptysis (coughing up blood or rust-colored phlegm)
- Bone pain
- Clubbing
- Fever
- Generally feeling tired or weak
- Superior vena cava obstruction- facial, neck, upper torso swelling. This is caused by compression of vasculature by the lung tumor that restricts blood return from the upper body.
- Dysphagia (trouble swallowing or the sensation that something is caught in the throat) and hoarseness
- New onset of wheezing without history of asthma

Clinicians should have a high level of suspicion for lung cancer, especially in patients with a smoking history. Patients with recurring or unresolving lung infections (e.g. bronchitis and pneumonia) that are unresponsive to antibiotics should also be further evaluated for lung cancer. In nonsmokers, women and East Asians are more likely to present with symptoms of an underlying lung cancer at younger ages. Importantly, many of these signs are commonly due to other causes that are not cancer.

=== Extrapulmonary manifestations ===
The most common paraneoplastic syndromes associated with adenocarcinoma of the lung are described below:

- Hypercalcemia of malignancy is more common in squamous cell carcinoma of the lung, but can occur in adenocarcinoma as well. Parathyroid hormone-related peptide (PTHrP) is produced by tumor cells and functions similarly to parathyroid hormone (PTH). The production of this hormonally active peptide by cancer cells causes increased bone resorption via upregulation of osteoclasts, one of the cells responsible for bone remodeling. When bone is broken down, calcium is released into the bloodstream, resulting in hypercalcemia. The signs and symptoms of elevated calcium in the blood include: thirst, fatigue, constipation, polyuria (increased urination), and nausea. It is important to rule out bony metastases in patients with NSCLC because they also present with hypercalcemia.
- Hypertrophic pulmonary osteoarthropathy (HPO) is fairly rare in adenocarcinoma. Less than 1% of patients with adenocarcinoma of the lung will exhibit this finding, but when it does occur, it is a poor prognostic factor. The exact mechanism of HPO is unknown but it is thought to be hormonal or neurogenic in etiology. The triad of HPO includes distal clubbing, arthritis, and bilateral symmetrical periosteal formation.

== Causes ==
=== Risk factors ===
According to the Nurses' Health Study, the risk of pulmonary adenocarcinoma increases substantially after a long duration of tobacco smoking: smokers with a previous smoking duration of 30–40 years are more than twice as likely to develop lung adenocarcinoma compared to never-smokers (relative risk of approximately 2.4); a duration of more than 40 years increases relative risk to 5.

This cancer usually is seen peripherally in the lungs, as opposed to small cell lung cancer and squamous cell lung cancer, which both tend to be more centrally located, although it may also occur as central lesions. For unknown reasons, it often arises in relation to peripheral lung scars. The current theory is that the scar probably occurred secondary to the tumor, rather than causing the tumor. The adenocarcinoma has an increased incidence in smokers, and is the most common type of lung cancer seen in non-smokers and women. Deeper inhalation of cigarette smoke results in peripheral lesions that are often the case in adenocarcinomas of the lung. Generally, adenocarcinoma grows more slowly and forms smaller masses than the other subtypes. However, it tends to metastasize at an early stage.

== Mechanism ==
=== Pathogenesis ===
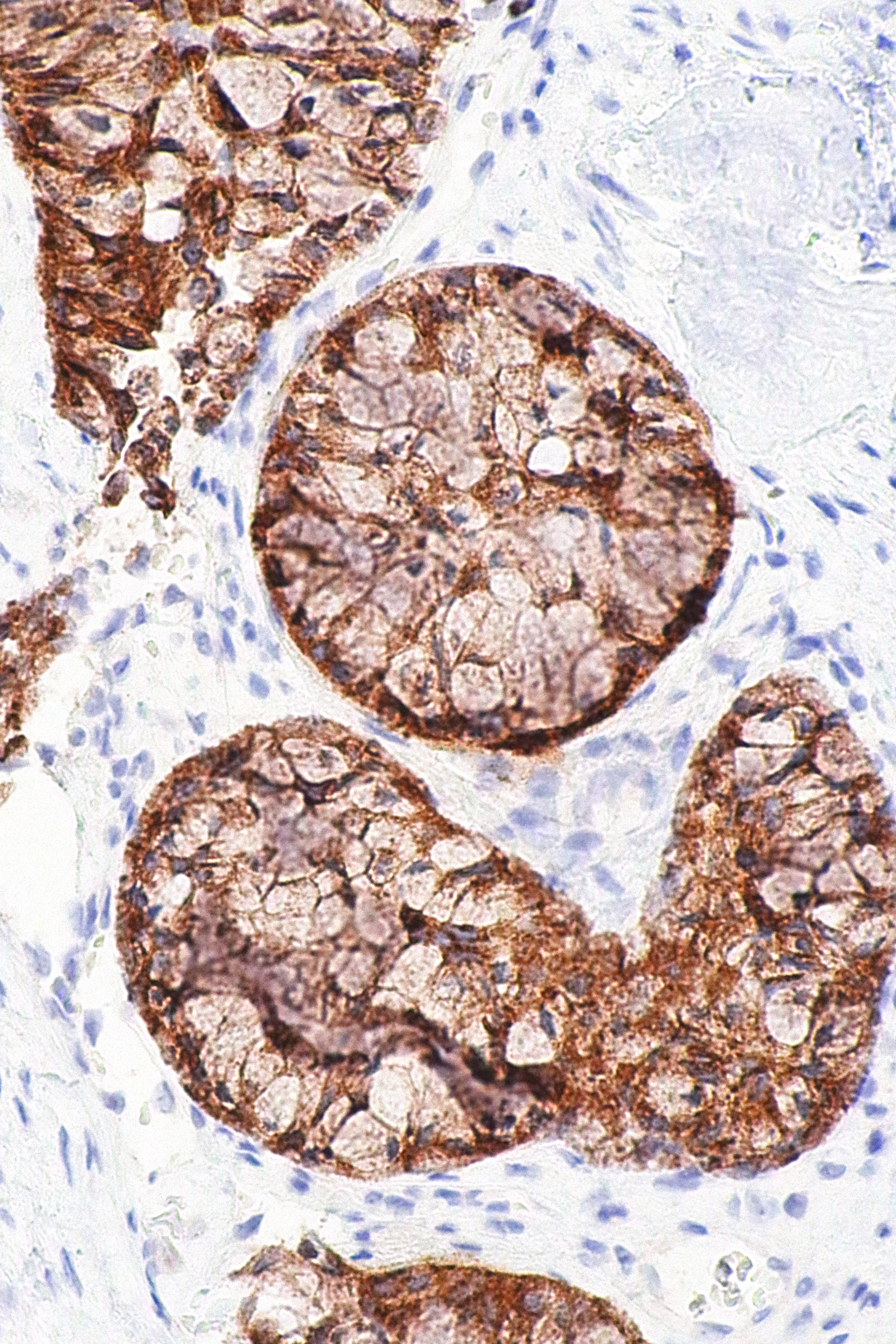
Micrograph showing an ALK positive adenocarcinoma of the lung. ALK immunostain.

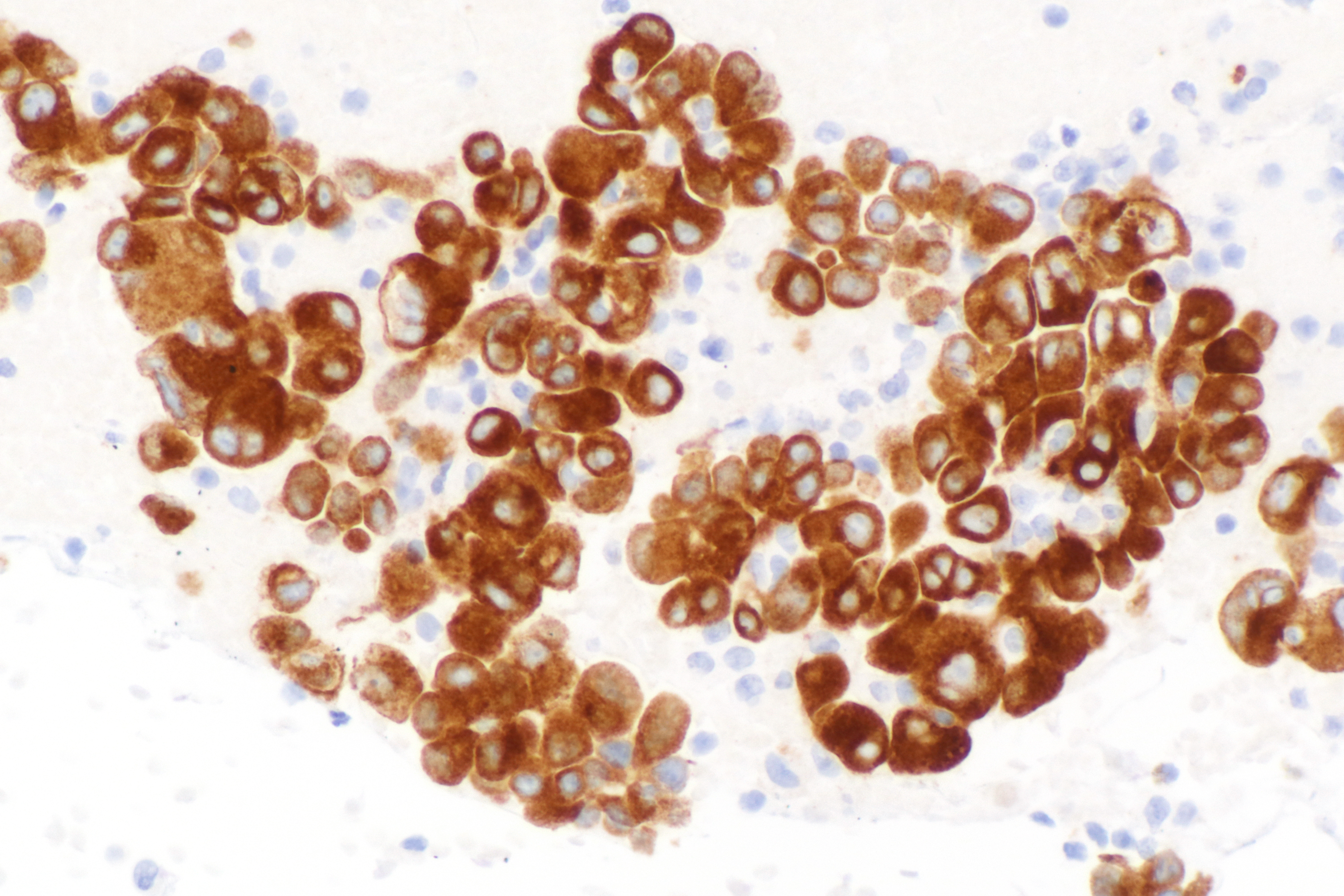
Micrograph showing a ROS1 positive adenocarcinoma of the lung. ROS1 immunostain.

Large scale studies such as The Cancer Genome Atlas (TCGA) have systematically characterized recurrent somatic alterations likely driving lung adenocarcinoma initiation and development.

==== Gene mutations and copy number alterations ====
Since smoking is a strong mutagenic factor, lung adenocarcinoma is one of the tumor types with the highest number of mutations. Common somatic mutations in lung adenocarcinoma affect many oncogenes and tumor suppressor genes, including TP53 (mutated in 46% of cases), EGFR (27%), KRAS (32%), KEAP1, STK11 and NF1. EGFR and KRAS mutations tend to appear in a mutually exclusive fashion. KRAS mutations are associated with smoking habits, whereas EGFR mutations occur more frequently in females, people of Asian ethnicity and never-smokers.

Copy number amplifications in oncogenes such as TERT, Mdm2, EGFR, MET, and Myc have been reported, as well as deletions of tumor suppressor genes such as CDKN2A.

Frequent alterations occur in genes belonging to the receptor tyrosine kinase pathway, of which EGFR is the most prominent example. This pathway is involved in cell proliferation and survival and it is often deregulated in cancer. As a consequence, targeted therapies have been developed to inhibit mutant pathway components.

==== Chromosomal rearrangements ====
Three membrane associated tyrosine kinase receptors are recurrently involved in fusions or rearrangements in adenocarcinomas: ALK, ROS1, and RET, and more than eighty other translocations have also been reported in adenocarcinomas of the lung.

In ALK rearrangements, the most common partner gene is EML4.

=== Pathophysiology ===
The respiratory tract can be divided into two main components: the conducting airways and the gas exchange airways. The gas exchange airways are made of alveoli, small microscopic air sacs that are responsible for the exchange of oxygen and carbon dioxide during normal breathing. Alveoli are composed of two cell types, type I and type II pneumocytes. Type I pneumocytes cover 95% of alveolar surfaces, and are not able to regenerate. Type II pneumocytes are more common, making up 60% of the cells within alveolar epithelium, but constitute only 3% of the alveolar surface.

There are several factors that contribute to the transformation of normal alveolar epithelium into dysplastic, or pre-cancerous, lesions. Adenocarcinoma of the lung develops in a step-wise progression as type II pneumocytes undergo consecutive molecular changes that disrupt normal cell regulation and turnover. Atypical adenomatous hyperplasia (AAH) is considered a pre-cancerous lesion, and is thought to further progress to adenocarcinoma in situ and invasive adenocarcinoma of the lung. The lesions of AAH are <5 mm, can be single or multiple, and have a ground glass appearance on CT imaging. As more genetic mutations and dysregulation of normal cell signaling pathways accumulate, AAH can progress to adenocarcinoma in situ (AIS). AIS lesions are classified as small tumors <3 cm with abnormal type II pneumocyte cell growth that is limited to the alveolar spaces i.e. without invasion into the stroma, pleura, or vasculature. This type of growth is termed "lepidic" and is characteristic of adenocarcinoma of the lung in its earliest stages.

== Diagnosis ==
A diagnosis of lung cancer may be suspected on the basis of typical symptoms, particularly in a person with smoking history. Symptoms such as coughing up blood and unintentional weight loss may prompt further investigation, such as medical imaging.

=== Classification ===
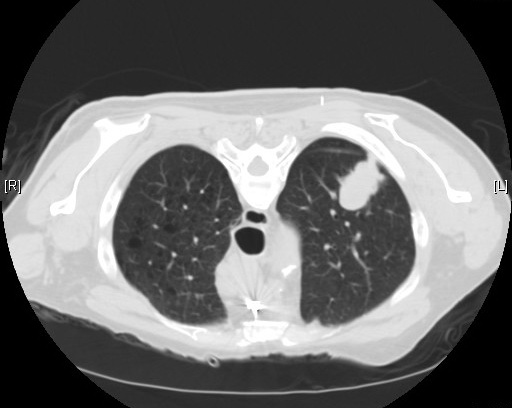
CT scan- adenocarcinoma of the left lung

The majority of lung cancers can be characterized as either small cell lung cancer (SCLC) or non-small cell lung cancer (NSCLC). Lung adenocarcinoma is one of the three major subtypes of NSCLC, which also include squamous carcinoma and large cell carcinoma.

Historically, there has been much debate in the most accurate method of describing adenocarcinoma of the lung and several revisions of classification systems have been published. Most recently, the International Multidisciplinary Classification of Lung Adenocarcinoma was published in 2011 and represents the consensus of several organizations to more accurately describe this specific type of lung cancer. The current classification system aims to more reliably predict prognosis and determination of therapeutic management.

The tumor size, pattern of cell growth, and depth of cell invasion into normal lung tissue are considered in determining classification. The following names represent a step-wise pathologic progression in the natural course of adenocarcinoma development; Adenocarcinoma in situ (AIS), Minimally invasive adenocarcinoma (MIA), and Invasive adenocarcinoma. Invasive adenocarcinoma of the lung includes a heterogenous mixture of subtypes and variants.

The 2011 consensus describes five subtypes of invasive adenocarcinomas based on the cell pattern that is most predominant. These subtypes are described below:

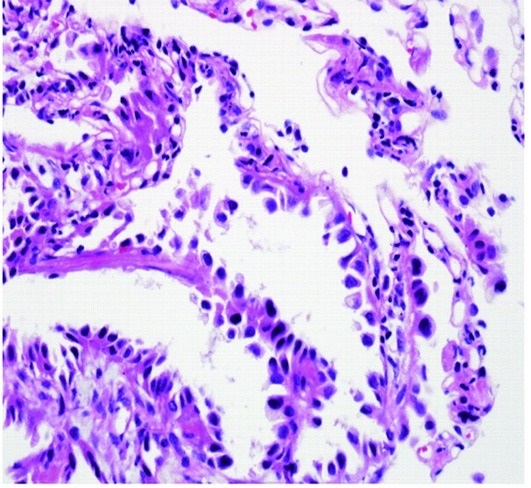
Histopathology of lepidic predominant adenocarcinoma

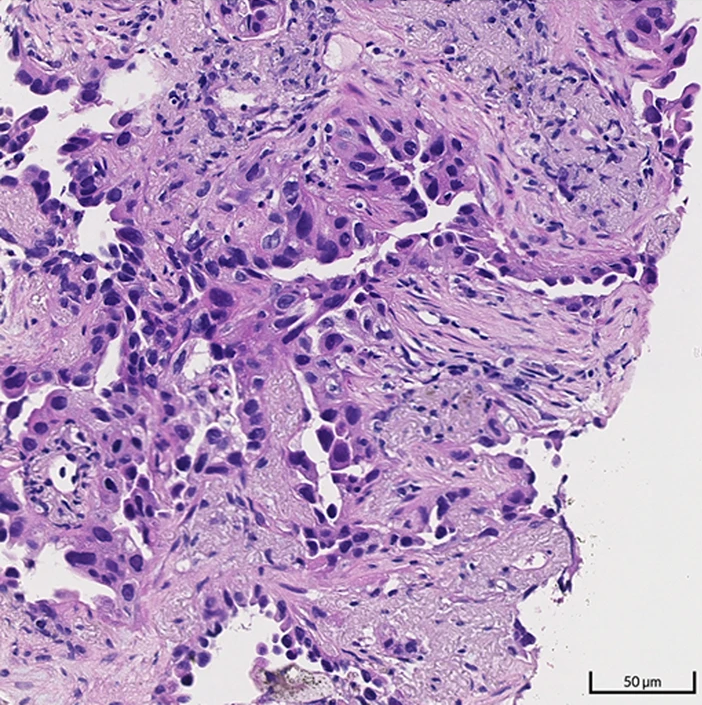
Acinar pattern

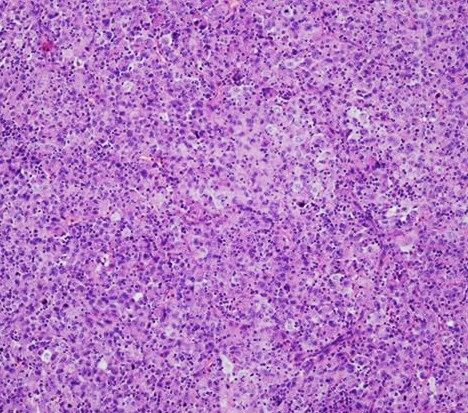
Solid pattern

- lepidic predominant
- acinar predominant
- papillary predominant
- micropapillary predominant
- solid predominant with mucin production

Cell patterns identifying subtypes are associated with prognosis, ranging from favorable (lepidic) to intermediate (acinar and papillary) to poor (micropapillary and solid).

Four discrete variants of invasive adenocarcinomas not assignable to these five subtypes are also included in the current classification:

- invasive mucinous adenocarcinoma
- colloid adenocarcinoma
- fetal adenocarcinoma
- primary pulmonary enteric adenocarcinoma

=== Imaging ===
CT imaging provides better evaluation of the lungs, with higher sensitivity and specificity for lung cancer compared to chest radiograph (although still significant false positive rate). Computed tomography (CT) that is specifically aimed at evaluating lung cancer includes the chest and the upper abdomen. This allows for evaluation of other relevant anatomic structures such as nearby lymph nodes, adrenal glands, liver, and bones which may show evidence of metastatic spread of disease. Indeed, the US Preventative Services Task Force recommends annual screening with low-dose CT in adults aged 55 to 80 years who have a 30 pack-year smoking history and currently smoke or have quit within the past 15 years, with certain caveats (see Lung cancer screening).

Nuclear medicine imaging, such as PET/CT and bone scan, may also be helpful to diagnose and detect metastatic disease elsewhere in the body. PET/CT uses a metabolically active tracer that allows clinicians to identify areas of the body that are hypermetabolic. Increased uptake of the tracer occurs in malignant cells and areas of inflammation or infection. Integrating the imaging reflective of metabolic activity with normal CT imaging allows for higher sensitivity and specificity compared to PET alone.

MRI is reserved for patients with advanced disease where intracranial, or brain, involvement is likely. It is also helpful for evaluating the extent of chest wall, diaphragmatic, brachial plexus (such as in the case of superior sulcus tumors), or spine involvement.

=== Histopathology ===
If possible, a biopsy of any suspected lung tumor is performed to make a microscopic evaluation of the cells involved and is ultimately required to confirm diagnosis. Biopsy should be attempted in distant lesions first to establish a histologic diagnosis and to simultaneously confirm metastatic staging. The biopsy material is also used to analyze whether the tumor expresses any specific mutations suitable for targeted therapy (e.g. EGFR mutation or ALK mutation). Biopsy can be accomplished via bronchoscopy, transthoracic needle biopsy, and video-assisted thorascopic surgery (VATS).

While sputum cytology has been shown to have limited utility, thoracentesis, or aspiration of pleural fluid with an ultrasound-guided needle, should be performed when pleural effusion is present. When malignant cells are identified in the pleural aspirate of patients highly suspect for lung cancer, a definitive diagnosis and staging (stage IV adenocarcinoma of the lung) is established.

Adenocarcinoma of the lung tends to stain mucin positive as it is derived from the mucus-producing glands of the lungs. Similar to other adenocarcinoma, if this tumor is well differentiated (low grade) it will resemble the normal glandular structure. Poorly differentiated adenocarcinoma will not resemble the normal glands (high grade) and will be detected by seeing that they stain positive for mucin (which the glands produce). Adenocarcinoma can also be distinguished by staining for TTF-1, a cell marker for adenocarcinoma.

As discussed previously, the category of adenocarcinoma includes a range of subtypes, and any one tumor tends to be heterogeneous in composition. Several major subtypes are currently recognized by the World Health Organization (WHO) and the International Association for the Study of Lung Cancer (IASLC) / American Thoracic Society (ATS) / European Respiratory Society (ERS): lepidic predominant adenocarcinoma, acinar predominant adenocarcinoma, papillary predominant adenocarcinoma, micropapillary predominant adenocarcinoma, solid predominant adenocarcinoma, and solid predominant with mucin production. In as many as 80% of these tumors, components of more than one subtype will be recognized. Surgically resected tumors should be classified by comprehensive histological subtyping, describing patterns of involvement in increments of 5%. The predominant histologic subtype is then used to classify the tumor overall. The predominant subtype is prognostic for survival after complete resection.

To reveal the adenocarcinomatous lineage of the solid variant, demonstration of intracellular mucin production may be performed. Foci of squamous metaplasia and dysplasia may be present in the epithelium proximal to adenocarcinomas, but these are not the precursor lesions for this tumor. Rather, the precursor of peripheral adenocarcinomas has been termed atypical adenomatous hyperplasia (AAH). Microscopically, AAH is a well-demarcated focus of epithelial proliferation, containing cuboidal to low-columnar cells resembling club cells or type II pneumocytes. These demonstrate various degrees of cytologic atypia, including hyperchromasia, pleomorphism, prominent nucleoli. However, the atypia is not to the extent as seen in frank adenocarcinomas. Lesions of AAH are monoclonal, and they share many of the molecular aberrations (like KRAS mutations) that are associated with adenocarcinomas.

Signet ring and clear cell adenocarcinoma are no longer histological subtypes, but rather cytological features that can occur in tumour cells of multiple histological subtypes, most often solid adenocarcinoma.

== Treatment ==
The treatment of adenocarcinoma of the lung depends on several factors including stage, resectability, performance status, histology and genomic alterations acquired by the individual tumor.

=== Surgery ===
Early stage (I, II and IIIA) lung adenocarcinomas are typically treated surgically to remove the tumor with pneumonectomy or lobectomy, if it is found to be resectable with imaging studies and biopsies and if the patient is considered able to tolerate surgery. Video-assisted thorascopic surgery (VATS) is often adopted, which consists in the insertion of a thorascope inside a small incision made in the chest; a lobe can be removed via the scope through this small incision.

Incidence of adenocarcinoma of the lung (in yellow) as compared to other lung cancer types, with fractions of non-smokers versus smokers shown for each type

=== Chemotherapy ===
For advanced (stage IV) and unresectable lung tumors, the first-line therapy is platinum-based doublet chemotherapy, combining cisplatin or carboplatin with another cytotoxic agent. Regimens strongly depend on each patient performance status and response, and when the risk of adverse events could worsen quality of life significantly, basic supportive care is more recommended. Chemotherapy is also used as an adjuvant therapy following surgery to kill remaining cancer cells in patients with stage IIA, IIB and IIIA NSCLC.

=== Radiotherapy ===
Adenocarcinoma is a non-small cell lung carcinoma, and it is not as responsive to radiation therapy compared to small cell lung carcinoma. However, radiotherapy may be used as an adjuvant therapy for patients who have undergone a resection surgery to reduce the risk of lung cancer relapse. It may also benefit inoperable tumors that are localized to the chest and be part of palliative care to improve quality of life in patients not responding to surgery or chemotherapy.

=== Targeted therapy ===
Targeted therapy is available for lung adenocarcinomas with certain molecular characteristics. Tyrosine kinase inhibitors (TKIs) have been developed to target mutant components of the receptor tyrosine kinase pathway such as EGFR, ALK and ROS1, which show frequent alterations in lung adenocarcinomas.

First-generation EGFR TKIs, including gefitinib and erlotinib, have been shown to be more effective in treating EGFR-mutated patients with respect to cytotoxic chemotherapy. Second-generation inhibitors such as afatinib and dacomitinib provided a broader scope of application as they are able to target not only the protein EGFR itself but also other members of the EGFR family, such as HER2 and HER4 (also known as ERBB2 and ERBB4), and they have shown improved progression-free survival compared to gefitinib. As the most common cause of acquired resistance to first-generation TKIs is a second EGFR mutation on codon 790, a third-generation EGFR TKI, osimertinib, has been developed to target this new mutation as well. MET amplification is another known mechanism of acquired resistance.

ALK inhibitors such as crizotinib showed to be effective against tumors harboring ALK fusions. Most patients previously treated with crizotinib benefited from second-generation ALK inhibitors including ceritinib, alectinib and brigatinib. Resistance to ALK inhibitors can occur with novel acquired ALK mutations or amplifications.

Also ROS1-positive tumors have shown high sensitivity to ALK inhibitors due to the high homology between the kinase domains of ROS1 and ALK.

=== Immunotherapy ===
Immune checkpoint inhibitors have been approved for NSCLC, including anti-PD-1 nivolumab and pembrolizumab. Anti-PD-1 agents are used for patients with advanced NSCLC whose tumors progress after first-line cytotoxic chemotherapy. Pembrolizumab was established as a new standard of care for patients with advanced or metastatic NSCLC with high PD-L1 expression levels, and responses are even more pronounced for tumor with a high mutational burden (i.e. having an elevated number of mutations).

Therapeutic approaches combining multiple immune checkpoint inhibitors or one immune checkpoint inhibitors and a cytotoxic agent are undergoing clinical trials as of 2018. Howerver, the KEYNOTE-598 phase III trial has reported in 2021 that adding ipilimumab to pembrolizumab for NSCLC patients with PD-L1 tumor proportion score ≥50% does not confer any efficacy benefit, but may introduce greater toxicity. The potential role of anti-PD-1 agents as neoadjuvant therapy in resectable NSCLCs is also being investigated.

== Epidemiology ==
As for other lung cancer subtypes, lung adenocarcinoma incidence is strongly associated with smoking.

Incidence of pulmonary adenocarcinoma has been increasing in many developed Western nations in the past few decades, with a share reaching 43.3% of all lung cancers in the US as of 2012, thus replacing squamous cell lung carcinoma as the most common type of lung cancer. This can be largely attributed to the decreasing smoking rates, which favors the adenocarcinoma histology. Indeed, although smoking is still its strongest risk factor, lung adenocarcinoma is by far the most common among lifelong non-smokers (<100 cigarettes in a lifetime).
