= Minimally invasive adenocarcinoma of the lung =

- Specialty: Oncology

Minimally invasive adenocarcinoma of the lung (MIA) is defined as a small (≤3 cm), solitary tumour with predominant alveolar epithelial appearance (lepidic growth), as in situ adenocarcinoma of the lung, with a zone of focal invasion of the stroma with a size inferior to 5 mm. For MIA—as with adenocarcinoma in situ—, the prognosis is near 100% survival.

== See also ==
- Atypical adenomatous hyperplasia of the lung
- Adenocarcinoma in situ of the lung
- Adenocarcinoma of the lung
