= Pulmonary atypical adenomatous hyperplasia =

Atypical adenomatous hyperplasia (AAH) is a hyperplastic lesion of the epithelial lining of pulmonary alveoli.

== Tumorigenesis ==
A multi-step carcinogenesis hypothesis suggests a progression from atypical adenomatous hyperplasia (AAH) through bronchioalveolar carcinoma (BAC) to invasive adenocarcinoma (AC), but to date this has not been formally demonstrated.
