= Jennerex =

American biopharmaceutical company

Jennerex, Inc.
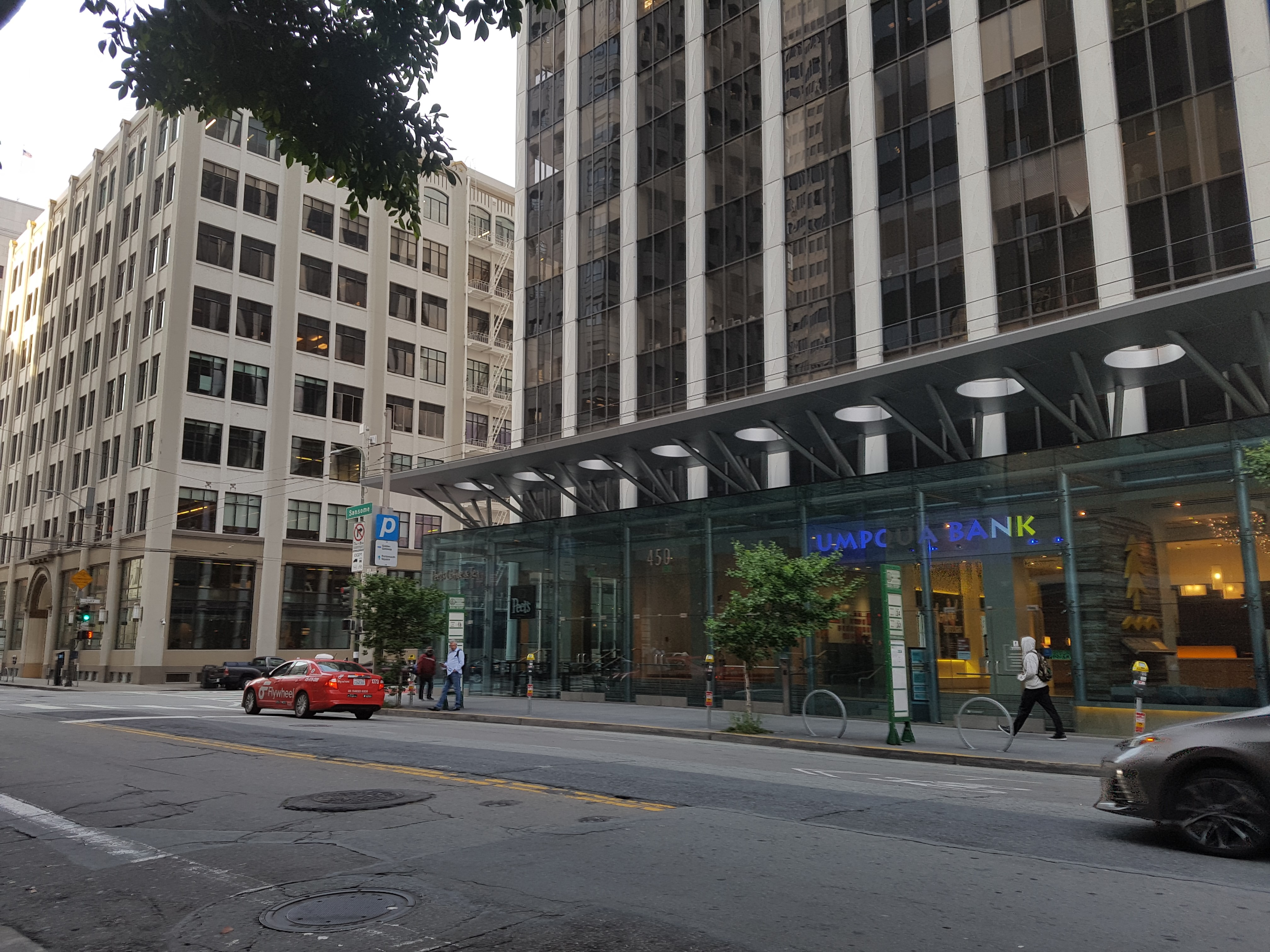
- Financial District, San Francisco
- Type: Private
- Industry: Biopharmaceuticals
- Founder: David H. Kirn
- Fate: acquired by SillaJen, Inc.
- Headquarters: 450 Sansome Street, 16th Floor, San Francisco, California, U.S.
- Number of locations: 4 (USA, Canada, South Korea)
- Products: Pexa-Vec (JX-594), JX-929
- Owner: SillaJen, Inc.
- Number of employees: ~50
- Website: www.sillajen.com

Jennerex Biotherapeutics, Inc. (now owned by SillaJen) was an American private biopharmaceutical company that developed the oncolytic viruses JX-594 and JX-929 among others. By creating oncolytic viruses that can (1) kill tumor cells directly through lysis, (2) activate the immune system by delivering genes that encode immunostimulants and by overcoming tumor cell-induced immunological tolerance, and (3) reduce tumor nutrient supply through the destruction of blood vessels, Jennerex aimed to create a novel approach to treating and possibly curing cancer.

== Company ==
Jennerex received its name in honor of Edward Jenner, the pioneer of the smallpox vaccine and "the father of immunology".

=== Locations ===
Headquarters are located in the Financial District, San Francisco. R&D and manufacturing operations are located at the UCSF Mission Bay campus in San Francisco, at the Ottawa Hospital Research Institute (OHRI) in Ottawa, Ontario, Canada, and at SillaJen, Inc. in Busan, South Korea.

== History ==
Jennerex, Inc. was established in 2003 in San Francisco.

In 2007, Jennerex completed Pexa-Vec Phase 1 clinical trial (HEP001). A year later, the company initiated Pexa-Vec Phase 2a clinical trial (HEP007).

European Medicines Agency (EMA) designated Pexa-Vec as an orphan drug for Live Cancer in 2009.

In 2011, Jennerex initiated Pexa-Vec Phase 2b clinical trial (HEP018) for Liver Cancer.

The United States FDA designated Pexa-Vec as an orphan drug in 2013.

SillaJen acquired Jennerex, Inc. in 2014 and changed the company name to SillaJen Biotherapeutics.

== Pipeline ==
Oncolytic viruses developed by Jennerex are based on the vaccinia virus.

=== Pexa-Vec (Jx-594) ===
Pexa-Vec is an engineered oncolytic virus that selectively destroys cancer cells and induces tumor immune response. Uncontrolled cell division, inactivation of the interferon pathway that is necessary to defend against viral infections, and constitutively active EGFR-Ras signaling pathway, are common features of cancer cells. These features enable rapid replication of the JX-594 virus and lysis of the host cancer cells. Deletion of thymidine kinase (TK) from the JX-594 genome prevents virus replication in normal cells. The immunostimulatory cytokine GM-CSF is produced from the JX-594 genome following infection, inducing immune response against both the virus and the tumor and enabling lasting tumor immunity. Finally, JX-594 reduces nutrient supply to tumors through blood vessel destruction. Because JX-594 is based on the Wyeth strain vaccinia virus that is commonly used for vaccination, it is well tolerated by rats, rabbits, and humans.

==== Design ====
To engineer JX-594, human GMCSF gene (encoding granulocyte macrophage colony-stimulating factor or GM-CSF; driven by a synthetic early/late promoter) and lacZ gene (encoding β-galactosidase or β-gal; driven by the p7.5 early/late promoter) were inserted into the TK gene (encoding thymidine kinase or TK) in the J segment of the Wyeth strain vaccinia virus. Elimination of TK from the JX-594 genome restricts viral replication to tumor cells, whereas GM-CSF production facilitates tumor immune response against, and β-gal is included for virus tracking purposes.

==== Efficacy ====
Initially, it was demonstrated that patients with refractory melanomas who received intratumoral injection of JX-594 (10^{4}-2 × 10^{7} PFU/lesion; 10^{4}-8 × 10^{7} PFU/session for 6 weeks) had mixed (3/7), partial (1/7), or complete (1/7) responses.

Upon comparison of intravenous (i.v.) delivery of JX-594 (10^{9} PFU) to intratumoral (i.t.) injection in immunocompetent liver cancer model in rabbits over 7 weeks, it was found that the i.t. treatment reduced the average primary tumor volume from 425 cm^{3} in control animals to 20 cm^{3} in i.t.-treated animals, and to 35 cm^{3} in the i.v. treatment group. Furthermore, the average number of lung metastases was reduced from 17 in control animals to 0.5 in i.t.-treated animals and none in the i.v.-treated animals.

==== Immune response ====
Dense infiltration of with CD4^{+} and CD8^{+} T lymphocytes into the tumor was observed following intratumoral injection of JX-594. Despite the presence of anti-vaccinia antibodies, virally encoded GM-CSF mRNA was detected at injection sites up to 31 weeks following the intratumoral JX-594 inoculation and was not present in the serum. Systemic GM-CSF was detected up to 7 weeks following both intratumoral and intravenous injection of JX-594.

==== Safety ====
Side effects following intratumoral injection are limited to flu-like symptoms and resolve within 24 hours. Toxicology studies in New Zealand White rabbits (3 weekly i.v. doses of 10^{10} PFU) showed that JX-594 was well tolerated, and no toxicologically significant effects were observed. There were no overt clinical signs, with the exception of ~5% of body weight loss by day 6 that was followed by a recovery by day 33.

=== JX-Next Generation ===
Novel oncolytic viruses in Jennerex pipeline are engineered through the Selective Oncolytic Vaccinia Engineering (SOLVE) platform. This platform is used to optimize virus targeting to specific cancer types, to select transgenes to include into the viral genome, and to optimize viral infection and/or replication selectivity through targeted mutations.

== Partnerships ==
Jennerex has partnered with Transgene, Green Cross, Lee's Pharmaceuticals, Rex Medical, and SillaJen for JX-594 development and commercialization. As of October 9, 2012, Jennerex has not licensed rights for JX-594 in either the United States or Japan.
