= Pneumocytic hyperplasia =

Pneumocytic hyperplasia is an hyperplasia of pneumocytes lining pulmonary alveoli.

== Types ==
- Pulmonary atypical adenomatous hyperplasia
- Multifocal micronodular pneumocyte hyperplasia
