= Multifocal micronodular pneumocyte hyperplasia =

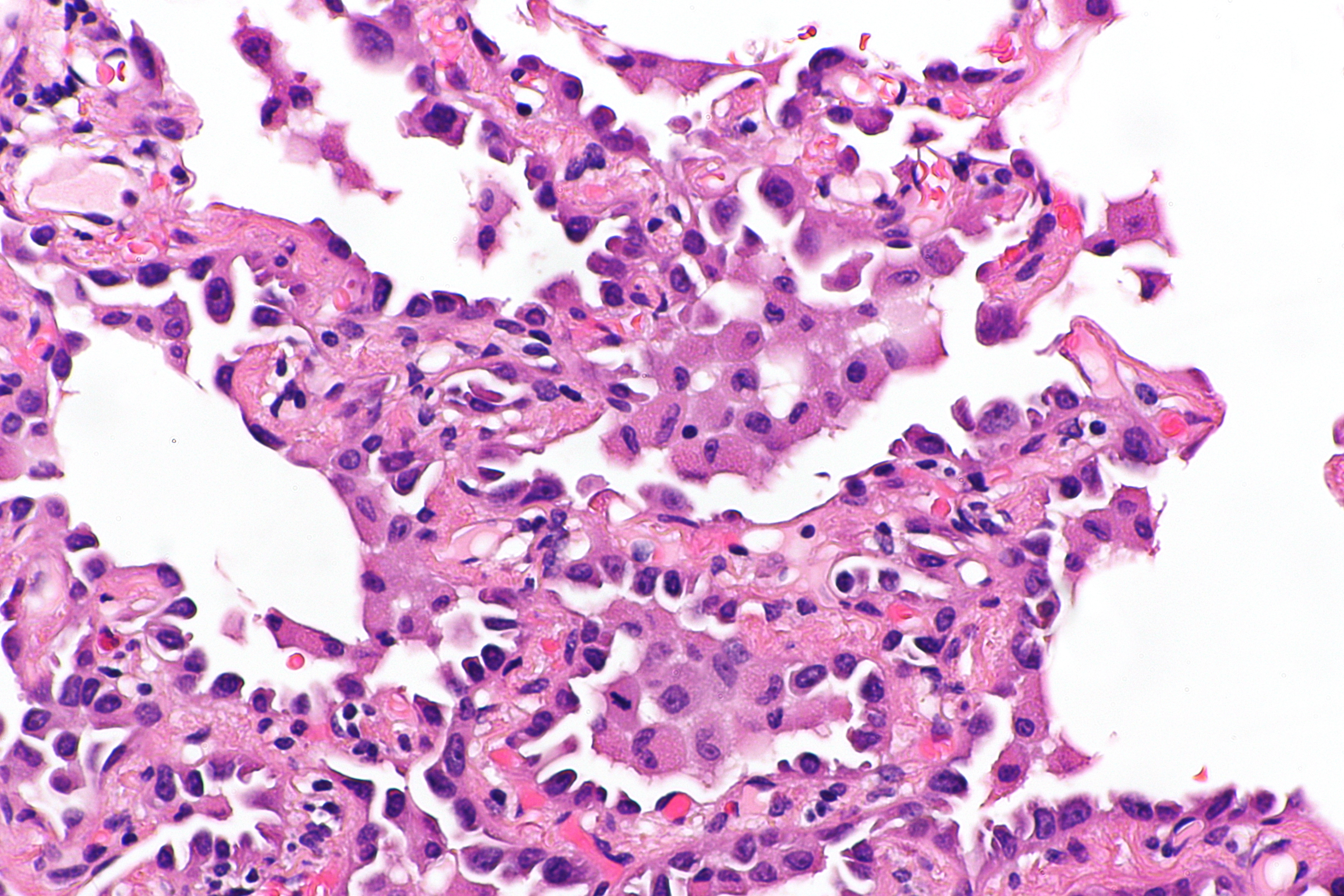
Micrograph showing multifocal micronodular pneumocyte hyperplasia. H&E stain.

Multifocal micronodular pneumocyte hyperplasia (MMPH) is a subtype of pneumocytic hyperplasia (hyperplasia of pneumocytes lining pulmonary alveoli).

Several synonymous terms have been done for this entity: adenomatoid proliferation of alveolar epithelium, papillary alveolar hamartoma, multifocal alveolar hyperplasia, multinodular pneumocyte hyperplasia.

These multifocal lesions are observed in tuberous sclerosis, and can be associated with lymphangioleiomyomatosis and perivascular epithelioid cell tumour (PEComa or clear cell "sugar tumor")).

It can be diagnosed through lung biopsy using thoracoscopy.

== Microscopy ==
- Well-demarcated, nodular lesions ranging 2–5 mm in pulmonary parenchyma.
- Type II pneumocytes without nuclear atypia lined thickened alveolar septa and proliferated papillary structures.
- Enlarged cuboidal cells lining mildly thickened alveolar septa.
- Enlarged cuboidal cells have abundant, eosinophilic cytoplasm and large, round nuclei.
- Papillary pattern with irregular margin and lymphocyte infiltration in the stroma.
- No proliferation of immature smooth muscle cells suggestive of lymphangioleiomyomatosis.

== See also ==
- atypical adenomatous hyperplasia
- pneumocytic hyperplasia
