= Pexastimogene devacirepvec =

JX-594 is an oncolytic virus is designed to target and destroy cancer cells. It is also known as Pexa-Vec, INN pexastimogene devacirepvec) and was constructed in Dr. Edmund Lattime's lab at Thomas Jefferson University, tested in clinical trials on melanoma patients, and licensed and further developed by SillaJen.

JX-594 is a modified Copenhagen strain (or Wyeth strain) vaccinia poxvirus engineered by addition of the GM-CSF gene and deletion of the thymidine kinase gene which limits viral replication to cells with high levels of thymidine kinase, typically seen in cancer cells with a mutated RAS or p53 gene. The virus also has the LacZ gene insertion under control of the p7.5 promoter. The virus kills the infected/cancer cells by lysis and also expresses GM-CSF which may help initiate an anti-tumour immune response.

It has orphan drug designation from US Food and Drug Administration and EUMA for the treatment of hepatocellular carcinoma (liver cancer).

In clinical trials doses have been administered by intratumoral or intravenous injection.

== Technology ==
Pexa-Vec (JX-594) is the most advanced product candidate from SillaJen's proprietary SOLVE™ (Selective Oncolytic Vaccinia Engineering) platform. SOLVE is used to optimize virus targeting to specific cancer types, to select transgenes to include into the viral genome, and to optimize viral infection and/or replication selectively through targeted mutations.

Oncolytic viruses could have 3-prolonged attack on cancer: direct cell lysis with replication and spread, immune activation, and antivascular

- Tumor selective intratumoral replication of the virus leads to lysis of the infected cancer cell and spread to adjacent cancer cells
- Induction of tumor-specific cytotoxic T-lymphocytes and “arming” for expression of therapeutic transgene products (e.g. GM-CSF) enhance immune response to the tumor
- Blood flow to tumors can be blocked following intratumoral replication and spreadJX-900 (VVDD): VVDD Platform: Next-gen enhanced oncolytic immunotherapy.

JX-900 (VVDD): VVDD Platform: Next-gen enhanced oncolytic immunotherapy.

- JX-900 is a series of modified vaccinia vaccine (Western Reserve strain) with enhanced oncolytic potency
- Attenuation via “Double-Deletion” : thymidine kinase and vaccinia growth factor gene inactivation
- JX-929 (vvDD expressing CD for 5-FU pro-drug) experience in solid tumors (CRC and melanoma)
- JX-970 (vvDD expressing granulocyte-macrophage colony-stimulating factor) next generation of the VVDD series

== Clinical trials ==
A phase 3 randomized, open-label, clinical trial of Pexa-Vec plus sorafenib versus sorafenib is being conducted on patients with advanced hepatocellular carcinoma who have not previously received any systemic therapy. The study is being done to determine and compare overall survival for patients in the two treatment arms. The study is Sponsored by SillaJen, Inc.

=== Mechanism of Action of Pexa-Vec (Jx-594) ===
The experimental therapy, Pexa-Vec, is an attenuated vaccinia virus engineered to stimulate anti-tumor immunity and directly lyse tumor cells. Pexa-Vec has cancer selectivity through the deactivation of its thymidine kinase gene, and it has been engineered to express the granulocyte-macrophage colony-stimulating factor gene to stimulate a systemic anti-tumor immune response. Researchers believe that Pexa-Vec may be a systemic treatment of hepatocellular carcinoma by inducing tumor necrosis and shrinkage of both injected and non-injected tumors after direct intratumoral delivery. Final data from a randomized dose-ranging phase 2 study of Pexa-Vec in mainly sorafenib naïve patients with advanced hepatocellular carcinoma demonstrated that the risk of death for patients who received Pexa-Vec at the high dose was markedly reduced (by nearly 60 percent; hazard ratio = 0.41) when compared to patients randomized to a low dose control (one-tenth of the high dose). The median overall survival for high and low dose groups was 14.1 months versus 6.7 months, respectively (p = 0.020 for superiority of the high dose). Pexa-Vec was well tolerated, with patients experiencing transient flu-like symptoms that generally resolved within 24 hours.

As of June 2018, these are the clinical trials investigating Pexa-Vec.

Clinical trials investigating Pexa-Vec (as of June 2018)
Indication	Phase	Status	Notes	Sponsor	Ref
Hepatocellular carcinoma	III	Recruiting	Combined with sorafenib	SillaJen	NCT02562755
Solid Tumors	II	Recruiting	Combined with metronomic cyclophosphamide	Investigator	NCT02630368
Renal Cell Carcinoma 2L	I	Recruiting	Combined with REGN2810	SillaJen	NCT03294083
Colorectal Cancer 2L/3L	I	Recruiting	Combined with PD-L1 and CTLA4	Investigator	
Liver Cancer	I	Recruiting	Combined with Nivolumab	Transgene	NCT03071094
Solid Tumors	I	Recruiting	Combined with Ipilimumab	Investigator	NCT02977156

=== Study Design ===
Participants will be randomly assigned to one of two treatment arms, having an equal chance of receiving either Pexa-Vec followed by sorafenib, or sorafenib alone.

==== Arm A: Pexa-Vec followed by sorafenib ====
- Participants will visit the study center approximately 14 times over 18 weeks.
- All Pexa-Vec treatments (3) will be given by intratumoral injections into liver tumors.
- Following Pexa-Vec injection series completion, patients will receive sorafenib starting at week 6 of the study

==== Arm B: sorafenib ====
- Participants will visit the study center approximately 12 times over 18 weeks and receive sorafenib as per standard of care.

== Pipeline candidates ==
=== JX-Next Generation ===
Novel oncolytic viruses in SillaJen pipeline are engineered through the Selective Oncolytic Vaccinia Engineering (SOLVE) platform.

=== JX-929 ===
JX-929 is derived from Western Reserve strain vaccinia virus. JX-929's tumor selectivity has been optimized through deletion of thymidine kinase and vaccinia growth factor. JX-929 has been administered as a monotherapy to patients with breast, colorectal, and pancreatic cancer via intratumoral & intravenous injections in a Phase 1, dose escalation clinical trial. This Phase 1 study showed delivery to and replication within tumors both IT and IV.

=== JX-970 ===
JX-970 is also derived from a Western Reserve strain vaccinia virus and utilizes the same tumor selectivity mechanisms as JX-929. In addition, it expresses granulocyte-macrophage colony-stimulating factor to stimulate immune responses. In nonclinical studies, the JX-970 backbone exerted a tumor debulking effect and at the same time demonstrated a selective preference for tumor tissues. The precursor of JX-970 is JX-963 which demonstrated efficacy in pre-clinical studies.
