= David H. Kirn =

David H. Kirn is an American entrepreneur-innovator, physician-scientist, CEO and professor. He is co-founder and CEO of 4D Molecular Therapeutics (4DMT), a biotechnology company designing and developing adeno-associated virus gene therapy vectors.

Kirn is the co-founder and board member of the Life Sciences Entrepreneurship Center at UC Berkeley and was the inaugural course co-director, and is currently a lecturer for the Robinson Life Sciences Business and Entrepreneurship Program at UC Berkeley. Kirn is also a professor teaching biotechnology entrepreneurship at UC Berkeley.

Prior to 4DMT, he was co-founder, CEO and Executive Chairman of Ignite Immunotherapy Inc, an oncolytic virus cancer vaccine company that he sold to Pfizer.

Kirn was also founder and CEO of Jennerex (2003–2013) and was the first development employee and vice president of clinical research at Onyx Pharmaceuticals (1994–2000). where he led the ONYX-015 oncolytic virus program and the first sorafenib (Nexavar) clinical development plan (1994-2000). Kirn was also SVP of Clinical Research and Development at Celgene.

He has held other academic positions at the University of California, San Francisco Medical School; the University of Oxford; and was chief medical resident at Harvard Medical School. His published work on oncolytic adenoviruses includes Onyx-015 and has appeared in Nature and Nature Medicine.
