= Pulmonary enteric adenocarcinoma =

- Specialty: Oncology/pulmonology

Pulmonary enteric adenocarcinoma is rare subtype of pulmonary adenocarcinoma.

== Presentation ==
The presentation is similar to that of other lung cancers. There is nothing in the radiological appearances that would suggest this particular histology. Two-thirds of reported cases have occurred in the right lung. The reason for this difference is not known and may be due to chance.

== Histology ==
The typical histological appearance of this tumour of tall columnar cells arranged in an irregular glandular cavity or cribriform pattern with extensive central necrosis. The cells resemble those of the intestinal epithelium and colorectal carcinomas.

== Diagnosis ==
Diagnosis of this type of lung cancer is by biopsy, histology and special staining. CT and colonoscopy to rule out a colonic primary are recommended.

== Treatment ==
Optimal treatment for this condition is not known. Surgery to remove the lesion is the usual form of treatment. Whether radiotherapy or chemotherapy can offer any advantage is not known.

== Prognosis ==
The small number of reported cases makes any prognostication extremely difficult. Survival seems to be somewhat better than the more common types of lung cancer.

== Epidemiology ==
This type is considered to be rare with fewer than 30 reports in the literature. The male:female ratio is approximately 1. This condition is more common in smokers.

== History ==
This type of lung cancer was first recognised by the International Association for the Study of Lung Cancer in 2011. It was first described in 1991.
