= Adenocarcinoma in situ of the lung =

- Detail of a CT thorax showing a mixed solid and ground glass lung lesion consistent with an adenocarcinoma of the lung.
- Specialty: Oncology

Adenocarcinoma in situ (AIS) of the lung —previously included in the category of "bronchioloalveolar carcinoma" (BAC)—is a subtype of lung adenocarcinoma. It tends to arise in the distal bronchioles or alveoli and is defined by a non-invasive growth pattern. This small solitary tumor exhibits pure alveolar distribution (lepidic growth) and lacks any invasion of the surrounding normal lung. If completely removed by surgery, the prognosis is excellent with up to 100% 5-year survival.

Although the entity of AIS was formally defined in 2011, it represents a noninvasive form of pulmonary adenocarcinoma which has been recognized for some time. AIS is not considered to be an invasive tumor by pathologists, but as one form of carcinoma in situ (CIS). Like other forms of CIS, AIS may progress and become overtly invasive, exhibiting malignant, often lethal, behavior. Major surgery, either a lobectomy or a pneumonectomy, is usually required for treatment.

== Causes ==
The genes mutated in AIS differ based on exposure to tobacco smoke. Non-smokers with AIS commonly have mutations in EGFR (a driver) or HER2 (an important oncogene), or a gene fusion with ALK or ROS1 as one of the elements.

== Mechanism ==
Nonmucinous AIS is thought to derive from a transformed cell in the distal airways and terminal respiratory units, and often shows features of club cell or Type II pneumocyte differentiation. Mucinous AIS, in contrast, probably derives from a transformed glandular cell in distal bronchioles.

A multi-step carcinogenesis hypothesis suggests a progression from pulmonary atypical adenomatous hyperplasia (AAH) through AIS to invasive adenocarcinoma (AC), but to date this has not been formally demonstrated.

Type-I cystic adenomatoid malformation (CAM) has recently been identified as a precursor lesion for the development of mucinous AIS, but these cases are rare.

Rarely, AIS may develop a rhabdoid morphology due to the development of dense perinuclear inclusions.

== Diagnosis ==
The criteria for diagnosing pulmonary adenocarcinoma have changed considerably over time. The 2011 IASLC/ATS recommendations, adopted in the 2015 WHO guidelines, use the following criteria for adenocarcinoma in situ:

- tumor ≤3 cm
- solitary tumor
- pure "lepidic" growth*
- No stromal, vascular, or pleural invasion
- No histologic patterns of invasive adenocarcinoma
- No spread through air spaces
- Cell type mostly nonmucinous
- Minimal/absent nuclear atypia
- ± septal widening with sclerosis/elastosis

* lepidic = (i.e. scaly covering) growth pattern along pre-existing airway structures

By this standard, AIS cannot be diagnosed according to core biopsy or cytology sampling. Recommended practice is to report biopsy findings previously classified as nonmucinous BAC as adenocarcinoma with lepidic pattern, and those previously classified as mucinous BAC as mucinous adenocarcinoma.

=== Classification ===
The most recent 2015 World Health Organization (WHO) and 2011 International Association for the Study of Lung Cancer (IASLC) / American Thoracic Society (ATS) guidelines refine pulmonary adenocarcinoma subtypes in order to correspond to advances in personalized cancer treatment.

AIS is considered a pre-invasive malignant lesion that, after further mutation and progression, is thought to progress into an invasive adenocarcinoma. Therefore, it is considered a form of carcinoma in situ (CIS).

There are other classification systems that have been proposed for lung cancers. The Noguchi classification system for small adenocarcinomas has received considerable attention, particularly in Japan, but has not been nearly as widely applied and recognized as the WHO system.

AIS may be further subclassified by histopathology, by which there are two major variants:

- mucinous (20–25% of cases)
- non mucinous (75–80% of cases)

== Treatment ==
This information is mostly in reference to the now outdated entity of BAC, which included some invasive forms of disease.

The treatment of choice in any patient with BAC is complete surgical resection, typically via lobectomy or pneumonectomy, with concurrent ipsilateral lymphadenectomy.

Non-mucinous BAC are highly associated with classical EGFR mutations, and thus are often responsive to targeted chemotherapy with erlotinib and gefitinib. K-ras mutations are rare in nm-BAC.

Mucinous BAC, in contrast, is much more highly associated with K-ras mutations and wild-type EGFR, and are thus usually insensitive to the EGFR tyrosine kinase inhibitors. In fact, there is some evidence that suggests that the administration of EGFR-pathway inhibitors to patients with K-ras mutated BAC may even be harmful.

== Prognosis ==
This information is mostly in reference to the now outdated entity of BAC, which included some invasive forms of disease.

Taken as a class, long-term survival rates in BAC tend to be higher than those of other forms of NSCLC. BAC generally carries a better prognosis than other forms of NSCLC, which can be partially attributed to localized presentation of the disease. Though other factors might play a role. Prognosis of BAC depends upon the histological subtype and extent at presentation but are generally same as other NSCLC.

Recent research has made it clear that nonmucinous and mucinous BAC are very different types of lung cancer. Mucinous BACis much more likely to present with multiple unilateral tumors and/or in a unilateral or bilateral pneumonic form than nonmucinous AIS . The overall prognosis for patients with mucinous AIS is significantly worse than patients with nonmucinous AIS .

Although data are scarce, some studies suggest that survival rates are even lower in the mixed mucinous/non-mucinous variant than in the monophasic forms.

In non-mucinous BAC, neither club cell nor type II pneumocyte differentiation appears to affect survival or prognosis.

=== Recurrence ===
When BAC recurs after surgery, the recurrences are local in about three-quarters of cases, a rate higher than other forms of NSCLC, which tends to recur distantly.

== Epidemiology ==
Information about the epidemiology of AIS is limited, due to changes in definition of this disease and separation from BAC category.

Under the new, more restrictive WHO criteria for lung cancer classification, AIS is now diagnosed much less frequently than it was in the past. Recent studies suggest that AIS comprises between 3% and 5% of all lung carcinomas in the U.S.

=== Incidence ===
The incidence of bronchiolo-alveolar carcinoma has been reported to vary from 4–24% of all lung cancer patients. An analysis of Surveillance epidemiology and End results registry ( SEER) by Read et al. revealed that although the incidence of BAC has increased over the past two decade it still constitutes less than 4% of NSCLC in every time interval. This difference in the incidence has been attributed to complex histopathology of cancer. While pure BAC is rare, the increase in incidence as seen in various studies can be due to unclear histological classification till WHO came up with its classification in 1999 and then in 2004. Another distinguishing feature about BAC is that it afflicts men and women in equal proportions, some recent studies even suggest slightly higher incidence among women.

== History ==
The criteria for classifying lung cancer have changed considerably over time, becoming progressively more restrictive.

In 2011, the IASLC/ATS/ERS classification recommended discontinuing the BAC classification altogether, as well as the category of mixed subtype adenocarcinoma. This change was made because the term BAC was being broadly applied to small solitary noninvasive tumors, minimally invasive adenocarcinoma, mixed subtype invasive adenocarcinoma, and even widespread disease. In addition to creating the new AIS and minimally-invasive categories, the guidelines recommend new terminology to clearly denote predominantly-noninvasive adenocarcinoma with mild invasion (lepidic predominant adenocarcinoma), as well as invasive mucinous adenocarcinoma in place of mucinous BAC.

== Additional images ==
Mucinous BAC

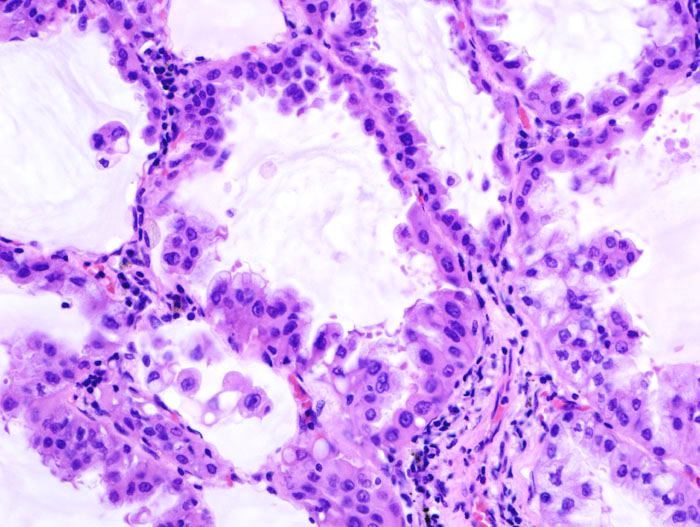

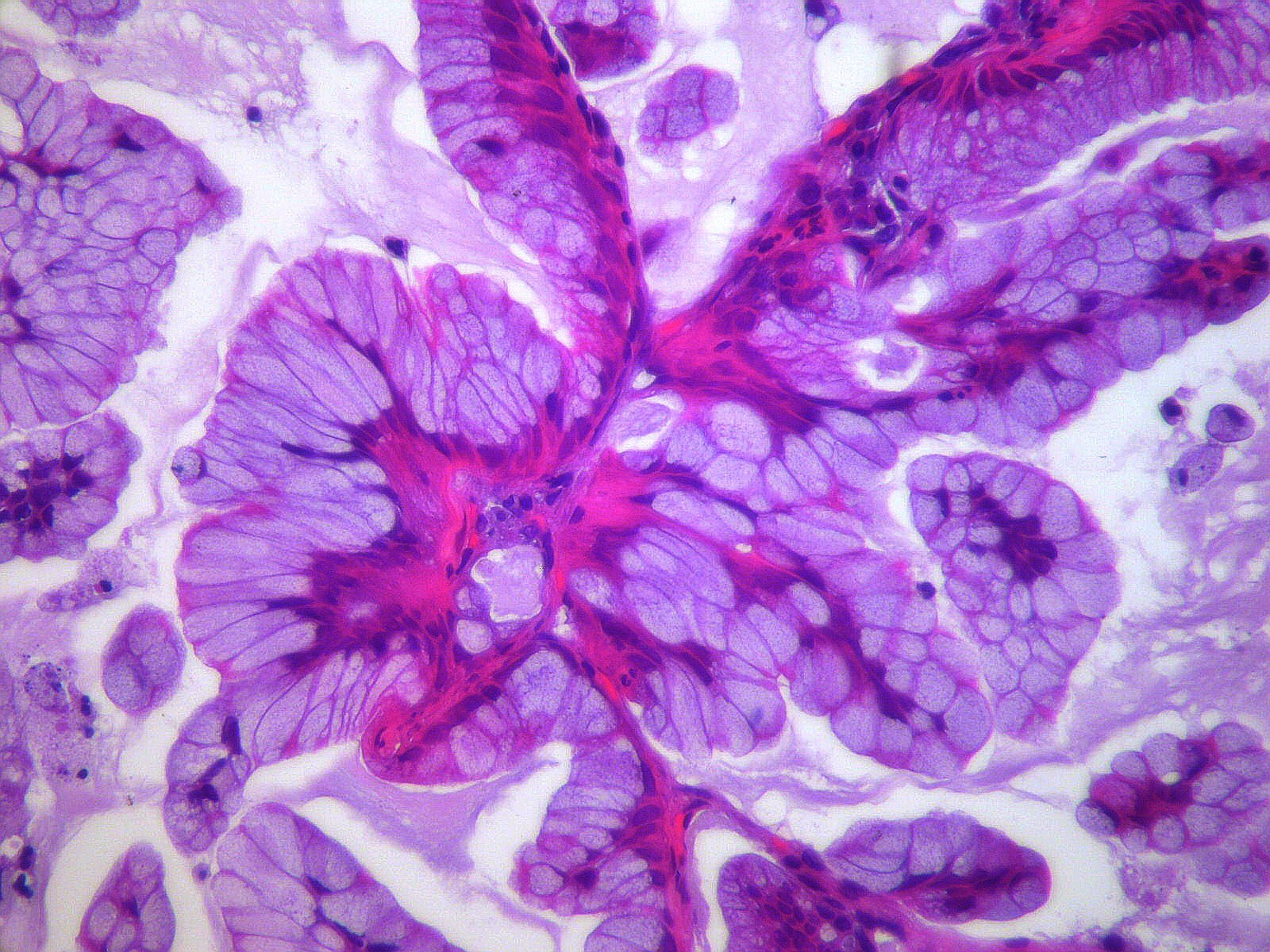

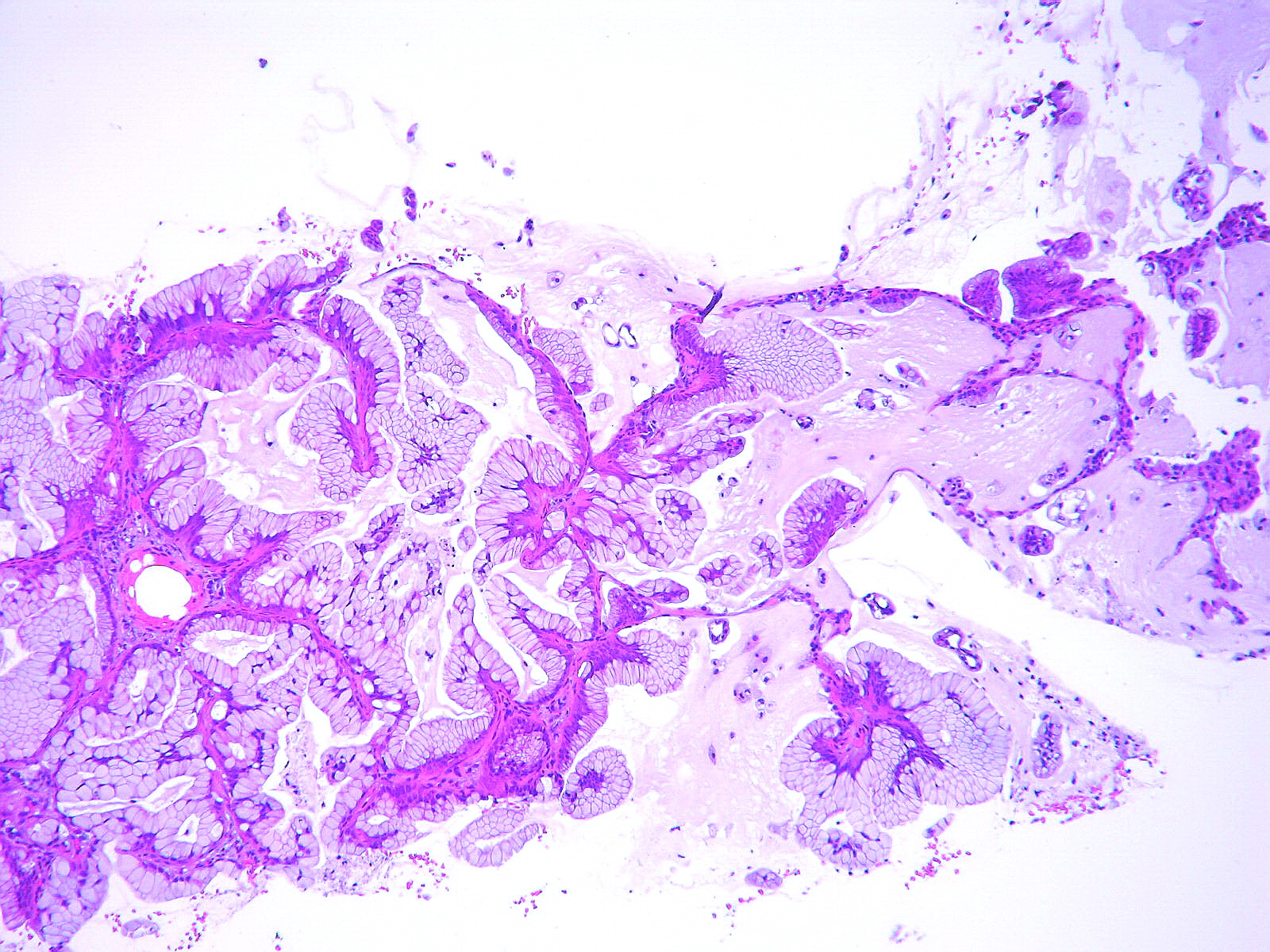

Non-mucinous BAC

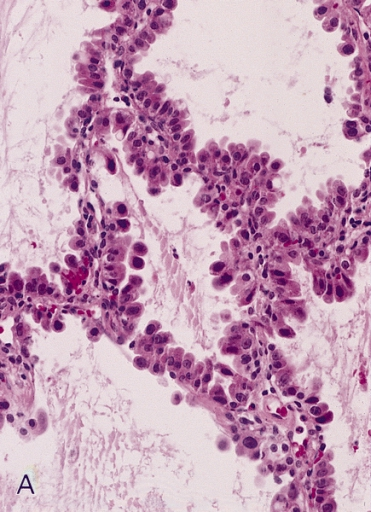

== See also ==
- Atypical adenomatous hyperplasia of the lung
- Minimally invasive adenocarcinoma of the lung
- Adenocarcinoma of the lung
