= Lung cancer staging =

Assessment of how much a lung cancer has spread

Lung cancer staging is the assessment of the extent to which a lung cancer has spread from its original source. As with most cancers, staging is an important determinant of treatment and prognosis. In general, more advanced stages of cancer are less amenable to treatment and have a worse prognosis.

The initial evaluation of non-small cell lung cancer staging uses the TNM classification. This is based on the size of the primary tumor, lymph node involvement, and distant metastasis. After this, using the TNM descriptors, a group is assigned, ranging from occult cancer, through stage 0, IA (one-A), IB, IIA, IIB, IIIA, IIIB to IV (four). This stage group assists with the choice of treatment and estimate of prognosis.

There are several methods by which this assessment is made. They are broadly classified into non-invasive techniques, which generally involve medical imaging of the lungs such as computer tomography (CT) scans and PET scans, and invasive techniques such as biopsy and surgery. Invasive techniques provide additional information because tissue samples can be examined under a microscope to confirm presence of cancer cells (as opposed to enlargement of tissues due to other causes such as infection) and to determine the type of lung cancer and its grade.

Staging may also be categorized as either clinical or as pathological/surgical staging. Clinical staging is performed prior to definitive surgery. It is based on the results of imaging studies (such as CT scans ) and biopsy results (i.e. clinical staging does include the results of biopsy, an "invasive technique.") Pathological staging is also called surgical staging and reflects not only the results of non-surgical biopsy, but is evaluated either intra- or post-operatively and is based on the combined results of surgical and clinical findings, including surgical sampling of thoracic lymph nodes.

== Lung cancer ==
Lung cancer is responsible for 1.3 million deaths worldwide annually and is the most common cause of cancer-related death in men and the second most common in women. According to the World Health Organization, lung cancer was responsible for approximately 10 million deaths in 2020. The most common cause of lung cancer is long-term exposure to tobacco smoke, and the carcinogens are typically found in cigarettes. In the United States, around 80%-90% of lung cancer deaths are among cigarette smokers. Lung cancer in non-smokers, who account for approximately 15% of cases, is often attributed to a combination of genetic factors, and exposure to radon gas, asbestos, and air pollution. The main types of lung cancer are non-small cell lung carcinoma and small cell lung carcinoma, the two being distinguished histologically as well as by how they are treated; non-small cell lung carcinoma is primarily treated with surgery if feasible, while small cell lung carcinoma is more frequently treated with chemotherapy and radiation.

The diagnosis of lung cancer is based on chest radiograph and computed tomography (CT) scans, and is confirmed by biopsy. Biopsy is usually performed via bronchoscopy or CT-guided biopsy. Treatment and prognosis depend upon the histological type of cancer, the stage, and the patient's performance status. Treatments include surgery, chemotherapy, and radiotherapy.

== Pattern of progression ==
Lung cancer can start in various portions of the lung. From there it spreads in fairly predictable pattern. Typically, if lung cancer spreads, it first goes to nearby lymph nodes, followed by lymph nodes further away located between the lungs in a space called the mediastinum. In the mediastinum, the lung cancer tends at first to stay on the side where the original tumor started. Once it crosses the mediastinal midline, it denotes more advanced, surgically unresectable disease. Lung cancer can also spread to distant organs, such as the liver or adrenal glands, which constitutes the most advanced stage of the disease called stage IV.

== Staging ==
Staging is the process of determining how much cancer there is in the body and where it is located. Staging of lung cancer is of paramount importance as treatment choices are often highly complex, even for physicians with much experience in the field, and the options largely depend on the stage of the disease. The underlying purpose is to describe the extent or severity of an individual's cancer, and to bring together cancers that have similar prognosis and treatment.

Staging information which is obtained prior to surgery, for example by x-rays and endoscopic ultrasound, is called clinical staging; staging by surgery is known as pathological staging.

Clinical staging is done by a combination of imaging and sampling (biopsies), or stated differently, non-invasive (radiological) and invasive (biopsy) methods.

Pathologic staging is more accurate than clinical staging, but clinical staging is the first and sometimes the only staging type. For example, if clinical staging reveals stage IIIB or IV disease, surgery is not helpful and no pathological staging information will be obtained (appropriately).

Lung cancer biopsies can be taken for two different reasons:

- Diagnosis: To find out whether an abnormality seen on a chest x-ray or CT scan is indeed lung cancer, and what histological type it is (small cell or non-small cell).
- Staging: To find out whether a structure, such as a lymph node in the mediastinum, has already been invaded by cancer or not.

However, it is often possible, with proper planning, to obtain both diagnostic and staging information with a single biopsy procedure.

There is an extensive array of staging methods available, each with advantages and disadvantages. Many cancer treatment centers review newly diagnosed patients at an inter-disciplinary chest tumor board where radiologists, oncologists, surgeons, pulmonologists, pathologists and EUS specialists (endosonographers) discuss the relative merits of the available modalities and make a choice by consensus.

=== TNM classification ===
The TNM staging system for lung cancer as defined by the 9th Edition of the TNM Classification (International Association for the Study of Lung Cancer [IASLC], American Joint Committee on Cancer [AJCC], and Union for International Cancer Control [UICC]) is as follows:

T – Tumor (primary tumor)

- Tx: Primary tumor cannot be assessed.
- T0: No evidence of primary tumor.
- Tis: Carcinoma in situ.
- T1: Tumor surrounded by lung or visceral pleura or located in a lobar or more peripheral bronchus.
  - T1mi: Minimally invasive adenocarcinoma.
  - T1a: Tumor ≤ 1 cm in greatest dimension.
  - T1b: Tumor > 1 cm but ≤ 2 cm.
  - T1c: Tumor > 2 cm but ≤ 3 cm.
- T2: Tumor with any of the following features:
  - T2a: Tumor > 3 cm but ≤ 4 cm in greatest dimension; invasion of visceral pleura; invasion of adjacent lobe; involvement of main bronchus (not including carina); or associated atelectasis/obstructive pneumonitis. .
  - T2b: Tumor > 4 cm but ≤ 5 cm in greatest dimension.
- T3: Tumor > 5 cm but ≤ 7 cm; or invading parietal pleura, chest wall, phrenic nerve, pericardium, or other defined structures; or separate tumor nodule(s) in same lobe.
- T4: Tumor > 7 cm; or invasion of mediastinum, heart, great vessels, trachea, recurrent laryngeal nerve, esophagus, vertebral body/spiral structures; or separate tumor nodule(s) in a different ipsilateral lobe.

N – Regional lymph nodes

- Nx: Regional lymph nodes cannot be assessed.
- N0: No regional lymph node metastasis.
- N1: Metastasis in ipsilateral peribronchial and/or hilar lymph nodes, including by direct extension.
- N2: Metastasis to ipsilateral mediastinal and/or subcarinal lymph node stations.
  - N2a: Metastasis(es) in a single ipsilateral mediastinal or in the subcarinal nodal station.
  - N2b: Metastases in multiple ipsilateral mediastinal nodal stations with or without involvement of the subcarinal nodal station.
- N3: Metastasis in contralateral mediastinal/hilar lymph nodes or in scalene/supraclavicular nodes.

M – Distant metastasis

- M0: No distant metastasis.
- M1a: Tumor with pleural or pericardial nodules or malignant pleural or pericardial effusions, separate tumor nodule(s) in a contralateral lob.
- M1b: Single extrathoracic metastasis.
- M1c1: Multiple extrathoracic metastases in a single organ system.
- M1c2: Multiple extrathoracic metastases in multiple organ systems.

==== Methods ====
| AJCC edition | published | went into effect | Lung cancer link(s) and page numbers in the original |
|---|---|---|---|
| 7 | 2009 | 2010 | AJCC, NCI, and NCCN |
| 6 | 2002 | 2003 | AJCC; original pages 167-177 |
| 5 | 1997 | 1998 | AJCC; original pages 127-137 |
| 4 | 1992 | 1993 | AJCC; original pages 115-122 |
| 3 | 1988 | 1989 | AJCC; original pages 114-121 |
| 2 | 1983 | 1984 | AJCC; original pages 99–105 |
| 1 | 1977 | 1978 | AJCC; original pages 59–64 |

The American Joint Committee on Cancer (AJCC) as well as the International Union Against Cancer (UICC) recommend TNM staging, which is a two step procedure. Their TNM system, which they now develop jointly, first classifies cancer by several factors, T for tumor, N for nodes, M for metastasis, and then groups these TNM factors into overall stages as shown in their table.

AJCC has provided web accessible poster versions of these copyrighted TNM descriptors and stage groups, to which readers are directed for accurate, detailed, up to date information; additionally, both the National Cancer Institute (NCI) and the National Comprehensive Cancer Network (NCCN) reprint these descriptors and grouping tables with AJCC permission, and extensively discuss staging modalities and treatment options, providing expert clear assistance in decisions about the best treatments. The NCCN pathways "outline the step-by-step treatment decisions from diagnosis through all phases of treatment and survivorship."

Although TNM classification is an internationally agreed system, it has gradually evolved through its different editions; the dates of publication and of adoption for use of AJCC editions is summarized in the table in this article; past editions are available from AJCC for web download. Therefore, it is important when reviewing reports of treatment or prognosis to be aware that the criteria used in the TNM system have varied over time, sometimes fairly substantially, according to the different editions. Literature reports usually reflect the staging that was in use while the study was initiated and performed, rather than when it was eventually published. The dates of publication and adoption for use of AJCC editions is summarized here to assist readers in understanding which era is being used by the literature.

| description | AJCC 6th edition classification | AJCC 7th edition classification |
|---|---|---|
| additional nodule(s) in the same lobe | T4 | T3 |
| extension (local invasion of certain structures) | T4 | T4 |
| additional nodule(s) in a different ipsilateral (same side) lobe | M1 | T4 |
| pleural effusion | T4 | M1a |

As in each edition of the TNM staging system, that used from 2010 January 1 (7 edition) made significant changes to the schema that is used for non-small cell lung carcinoma, small-cell lung carcinoma and broncho-pulmonary carcinoid tumors. The revisions were based on a detailed analysis and consensus process by AJCC and UICC that looked at the overall survival of 81,015 patients. The changes have been reviewed in detail, including an extensive presentation (with multiple tables and detailed discussion) of prognostic data for both 6th and 7th edition, looking at both individual T, N and M descriptors, and at overall stage groups. The table uses limited excerpts from the copyrighted TNM system to demonstrate the concept that there are changes, as well as similarities, between editions.

As a result, a given stage may have quite a different prognosis depending on which staging edition is used, independent of any changes in diagnostic methods or treatments, an effect that has been termed "stage migration." The technologies used to assign patients to particular categories have changed also, and it can be seen that increasingly sensitive methods tend to cause individual cancers to be reassigned to higher stages, making it improper to compare that cancer's prognosis to the historical expectations for that stage.

A further important consideration is the effect of improving treatments over time as well.

Dr. Clifton Mountain, a surgeon in Texas, made significant contributions to the TNM staging system, particularly in non-small cell lung carcinoma, and the literature thus often refers to "Mountain" staging.

=== VA classification ===
In small-cell lung carcinoma, the TNM classification is often used along with an additional categorization, the Veterans Administration Lung Cancer Study Group system. The VA scheme has two stages. Limited-stage disease is confined to an area that is tolerably treated by one radiotherapy area ("port"), but excludes cancers with pleural and pericardial effusions. All other small-cell lung cancers are extensive-stage in this scheme. There has been some drift over time in what this definition means.

=== Stages I-IV Grading ===
==== Stage III (T1 or T2, N2; T3, N0 or N1; T4, N0 or N1, M0) ====
===== Stage IIIA =====
- T1, N2, M0: T1 tumors with involvement in nearby lymph nodes. - T2, N1 or N2, M0: T2 tumors with lymph node involvement.

===== Stage IIIB =====
- T3, N0 or N1, M0: T3 tumors with limited lymph node involvement. - T4, N0 or N1, M0: T4 tumors with minimal or no lymph node involvement.

== Staging modalities ==
=== CT and PET scans ===
The mainstay of non-invasive staging is a CT scan of the chest followed by metabolic imaging with a PET scan. The CT scan shows abnormalities such as a lung nodule or enlarged lymph nodes whereas the PET scan reveals increased metabolism such as occurs in structures which contain rapidly growing cancer cells. PET/CT combined the benefits of functional assessment with PET and anatomic assessment with CT. PET/CT represents a significant advance for staging of patients with lung cancer with management impact in the order of 40% and discordant findings compared with conventional imaging in half of patients. PET/CT also has high inter- and intra-reporter agreement. The main benefit of PET is to identify distant metastatic disease, thereby indicating futility of locoregional approaches such as surgery or curative intent radiotherapy.

According to the American College of Chest Physicians (ACCP) Non-Invasive Staging Guidelines for Lung Cancer (2007), the pooled sensitivity and specificity of CT scanning for identifying mediastinal lymph node metastasis are 51% and 85%, respectively and for PET scanning 74% (95% CI, 69 to 79%) and 85% (95% CI, 82 to 88%), respectively. In other words, were one to rely on the results of non-invasive staging alone, between 21 and 31 percent of patients would be understaged (the cancer is more advanced than it seems) and between 12 and 18 percent of patients would be overstaged ( the cancer is in fact in an earlier stage than it seems). In selected clinical situations confirmation of the results of the status of the mediastinal nodes by sampling will therefore be necessary.

=== PFTs ===
Pulmonary function tests (PFT) are not a formal part of staging but can be useful in treatment decisions. Patients with lung cancer resulting from air pollution (occupational or cigarette smoking-related) are more likely to have other lung disorders such as COPD, which limit their respiratory reserve. Patients with limited respiratory reserve are at higher risk for postoperative complications should surgical treatment be pursued; they may not be able to tolerate the diminished lung capacity remaining after the removal of a portion of the lung.

=== Brain MRI ===
PET scans need to be specifically modulated to detect metastases within the brain, which otherwise shows fairly uniformly active uptake from normal brain activity. In practice, CT or MRI scans are used to detect brain metastases. Although MRI has a modestly higher detection rate and can find smaller metastases, contrast-enhanced CT scan can be a suitable choice due to many factors such as MRI-incompatible metal prosthetics, claustrophobia, or noise-intolerance.

=== Mediastinal staging ===
Nearly half of lung cancers have mediastinal disease at diagnosis. If cancer involves any of the mediastinal lymph nodes, these lymph nodes are designated N2 if they are on the same side as the original tumor, and N3 if they are on the other. N2, and particularly N3 lymph nodes, affect the clinical stage very significantly. The American Thoracic Society has standardized the nomenclature of lymph nodes in the chest. There are fourteen numbered nodal stations. Lymph nodes considered to be in the mediastinum are stations 1–9, which are thus potential N2 or N3 locations, while stations 10-14 are hilar and peripheral nodes, and thus potential N1 locations.

There are numerous modalities which allow staging of mediastinal lymph nodes. In the following table they are arranged from the most to the least invasive.

Advantages and disadvantages of various mediastinal staging procedures in lung cancer.
| Procedure | Advantages | Disadvantages |
|---|---|---|
| Thoracotomy (surgical opening of the chest) | Allows the most thorough inspection and sampling of lymph node stations, may be followed by resection of tumor, if feasible | Most invasive approach, not indicated for staging alone, significant risk of procedure-related morbidity |
| Extended cervical mediastinoscopy combined with a Chamberlain procedure, which is also called a left parasternal mediastinotomy, or anterior mediastinotomy | Permits evaluation of the lymph nodes of the aortopulmonary space | More invasive; false-negative rate approximately 10%. |
| Chamberlain procedure | Access to station 5 (lymph nodes of the aortopulmonary space) | Limited applications, invasive. |
| Cervical mediastinoscopy | Still considered the gold standard (usual comparitor) by many, excellent for 2RL 4RL. | Does not cover all medastinal lymph node stations, particularly subcarinal lymph nodes (station 7), paraesophageal and pulmonary ligament lymph nodes (stations 8 and 9), the aortopulmonary space lymph nodes (station 5), and the anterior mediastinal lymph nodes (station 6); false-negative rate approximately 20%; invasive |
| Video-assisted thoracoscopy | Good for inferior mediastinum, station 5 and 6 lymph nodes | Invasive, does not cover superior anterior mediastinum |
| Transthoracic percutaneous fine needle aspiration (FNA) under CT guidance | More widely available than some other methods | Traverses a lot of lung tissue, therefore high pneumothorax risk, some lymph node stations inaccessible |
| Bronchoscopy with blind transbronchial FNA (Wang needle) | Less invasive than above methods | Relatively low yield, not widely practiced, bleeding risk |
| Endobronchial ultrasound (EBUS) | Direct visualization of lymph node stations. Complements EUS: covers lymph node stations 2R and 4R which are difficult to access by EUS; lower false-negative rate than with blind transbronchial FNA and fewer complications | More invasive than EUS, few practitioners, but rapidly growing in popularity |
| Endoscopic ultrasound (EUS) | Least invasive modality, uses the esophagus to access mediastinal lymph nodes, excellent for station 5, 7, 8 lymph nodes. Useful for station 2L and 4L, L adrenal, celiac lymph node | Cannot reliably access right sided paratracheal lymph node stations 2 R and 4R; accurate discrimination of primary hilar tumors and involved lymph nodes is important |

==== Endoscopic ultrasound ====
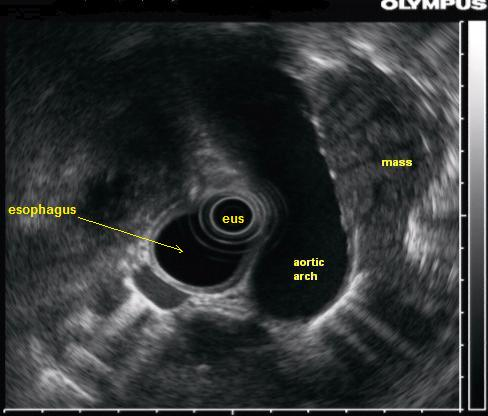
A lung mass which is partially behind the aorta is seen with endoscopic ultrasound.

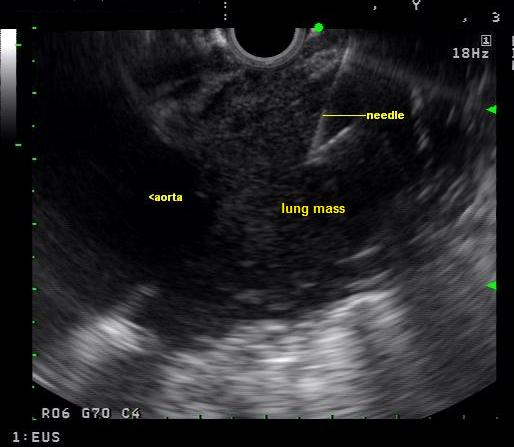
A biopsy window is found and an FNA needle advanced into the mass with EUS guidance

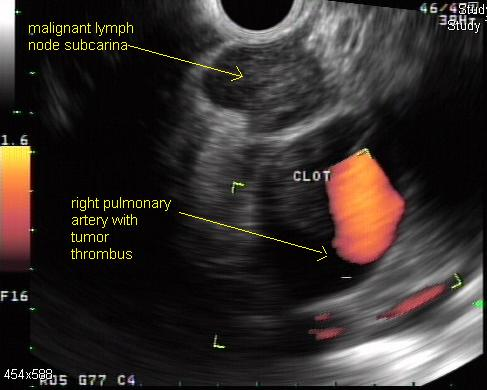
EUS shows a dark (hypoechoic) malignant appearing lymph node adjacent to the esophagus and close to the pulmonary artery

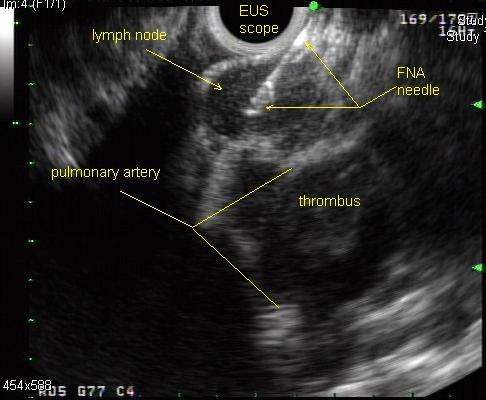
Lymph node biopsy: Real-time EUS-guidance avoids accidental puncture of blood vessels

===== Background =====
This section focuses on the emerging role various types of endoscopic ultrasound and biopsy are playing in the diagnosis and staging of lung cancer, with an emphasis on the most common type of lung cancer, non-small cell lung cancer (NSCLC). These techniques have been reviewed extensively and have attained substantial consensus in guidelines such as from the NCCN.

Endoscopic ultrasound (EUS) is an endoscopic technique where a miniaturized ultrasound probe is passed through the mouth into the upper gastrointestinal tract to investigate organs and structures close to the esophagus, stomach, or duodenum, such as the lung. In 1993, Wiersema published the first description of EUS to diagnose and stage lung cancer, done by advancing a fine needle through the esophagus into adjacent lymph nodes. Numerous subsequent studies have shown this general methodology to be effective, very safe, minimally invasive, and very well tolerated. Given these advantages, many authorities think that EUS together with endobronchial ultrasound (EBUS) enhances lung cancer diagnosis and staging.

===== Endoscopic ultrasound (EUS) =====
A metaanalysis published in 2007, based on 1,201 cancers in 18 high-quality clinical trials carefully selected by predefined criteria from the literature, systematically examined the performance of EUS-guided FNA in NSCLC staging. Two scenarios were considered: the setting of enlarged lymph nodes on CT (suggestive but not diagnostic of cancer), and the obverse scenario of an absence of lymph node enlargement on CT (suggestive but not diagnostic of no cancer). Overall, in both settings, minor complications were reported in 0.8% of procedures; no major complications were recorded. EUS-FNA in enlarged discrete mediastinal lymph nodes had an excellent pooled sensitivity (8 studies) of 90% (95% CI, 84 to 94%) and specificity of 97% (95% CI, 95 to 98%). EUS-FNA in the setting of no enlarged mediastinal lymph nodes on CT had a pooled sensitivity (4 studies) of 58% (95% CI, 39 to 75%) and specificity of 98% (95% CI, 96 to 99%). Although this sensitivity (58% in CT-negative disease) might on first consideration seem disappointing, if EUS is performed as a staging test it can help avoid more invasive staging procedures, or surgery, if positive (for the presence of cancer). In other words, an EUS that has a positive result (shows cancer) will avoid further needless surgery, whereas a result not showing cancer may be false-negative, and probably requires an excisional biopsy technique for confirmation, such as VATS or mediastinoscopy.

The ACCP guidelines recommend invasive staging for patients with or without mediastinal lymph node enlargement on CT regardless of the PET scan findings. If needle techniques are used (such as EUS-NA, TBNA, EBUS-NA, or TTNA) a non-malignant result should be further confirmed by mediastinoscopy as explained above.

EUS can reliably reach the lymph node stations 5, 7, 8 and 9. In the superior mediastinum the trachea is somewhat to the right of the esophagus which makes it often possible to reach left-sided area 2 and 4 lymph nodes and, less often, right sided paratracheal lymph nodes. In general, EUS is most appropriate for evaluation of the posterior inferior mediastinum while mediastinoscopy or EBUS are best for the anterior superior mediastinum. The feasibility of EUS-FNA of aorto-pulmonary space (subaortic) lymph nodes (station 5) is a major advantage of EUS. Evaluation of this station has traditionally required a paramedian mediastinotomy (Chamberlain procedure). EUS can easily sample celiac lymph nodes, which cannot be reached by the other mediastinal staging methods. In one recent study an unexpectedly high incidence of celiac lymph node metastasis (11%) was noted. EUS can also be used to biopsy potential left adrenal metastases, whereas the right adrenal gland is mostly inaccessible.

The potential utility of EUS-FNA in restaging of the mediastinum in patients who have undergone chemotherapy and radiotherapy for N2 or N3 disease is under investigation. The underlying idea is that initially advanced cancers, previously too extensive for surgery, may have responded to chemotherapy and radiation so much that they now may be operative candidates. Rather than immediately proceeding to thoracotomy based on CT or PET results, which could lead to an "open and close" thorax surgery, restaging, including invasive staging, may deselect non-responders, missed on imaging tests alone. If the initial mediastinal staging included a mediastinoscopy, most surgeons try to avoid a repeat mediastinoscopy after radiation treatment because of scarring. Although restaging by PET and CT scanning may help to provide targets for biopsies, the concept is that even PET-negative mediastinums need to be sampled. In N2 disease, EUS-FNA and EBUS-FNA appear to offer the best risk-benefit ratio in these patients.

===== Endobronchial ultrasound (EBUS) =====
As mentioned in the table, EUS cannot reliably access right sided paratracheal lymph node stations 2R and 4R and may not be optimal for the left sided paratracheal lymph node stations either. An adaptation of the endoscopic ultrasound scope originally designed for the gastrointestinal tract is known as endobronchial ultrasound (EBUS). The instrument is inserted into the trachea rather than the esophagus. There are two types of EBUS bronchoscopes available: radial catheter probe and convex probe EBUS (CP-EBUS), but only the latter concerns us here. Early experience with mediastinal staging by CP-EBUS appears very promising with sensitivities ranging from 92 to 96 percent in 4 series comprising 70 to 502 patients.

===== Combined ultrasound =====
Many patients will, if given a choice, prefer an instrument which is inserted into the esophagus (EUS) over one which is inserted into the trachea (EBUS). Furthermore, many patients with suspected lung cancer will have other smoking related illnesses, such as emphysema or COPD, which makes a bronchoscopy-like procedure (EBUS) a higher risk than an upper endoscopy through the esophagus (EUS). An area of active and emerging research concerns the value of combining EUS and EBUS in a single session, one specialist following the other, or -even more convenient- a dual trained operator doing one or the other – or both- as needed.

EUS-FNA and EBUS-FNA are complementary techniques. EUS has the highest yield in the posterior inferior mediastinum, and EBUS is strongest for the superior anterior mediastinum. Some lymph node stations can only be accessed by one method and not the other (for example, station 2 and 4 L and 3 are hard or impossible to see by EUS, stations 5 and 8 cannot be biopsied by EBUS). Together, EBUS and EUS cover the entire mediastinum (except possibly station 6) and complete mediastinal staging should be possible with a combination of these two procedures. This combination could conceptually eliminate the need for most surgical mediastinoscopies and in fact be more comprehensive.

When combined, this approach has been termed "complete medical mediastinoscopy." EUS-FNA with EBUS may allow near-complete, minimally invasive mediastinal staging in patients with suspected lung cancer
