= Thoracic lymph nodes =

Organ of the lymphatic system

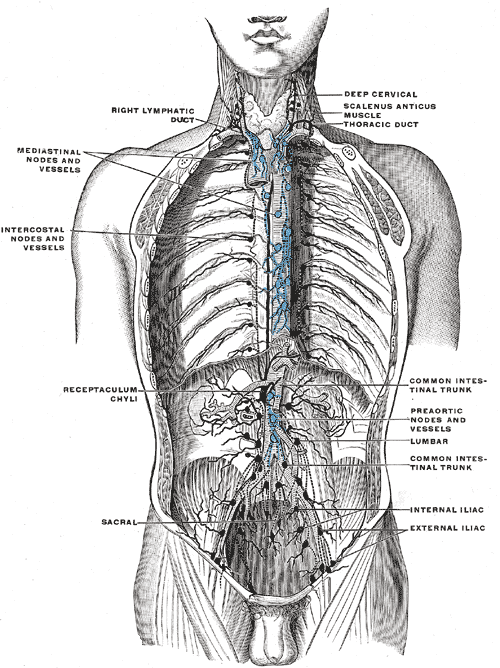
- Deep lymph nodes and vessels of the thorax and abdomen (diagrammatic). Afferent vessels are represented by continuous lines, and efferent and internodular vessels by dotted lines.

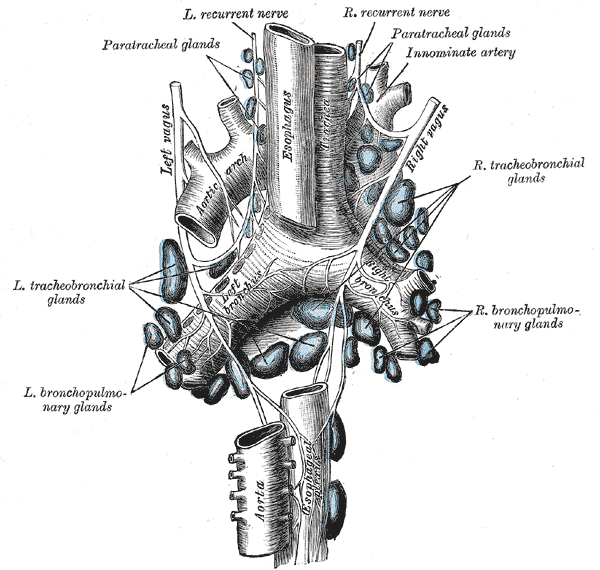
- The tracheobronchial lymph glands.

Details

Identifiers
- Latin: nodi lymphoidei thoracis
- FMA: 12772

The lymph glands of the thorax may be divided into parietal and visceral — the former being situated in the thoracic wall, the latter in relation to the viscera.
