= PMEL (gene) =

Protein-coding gene in humans

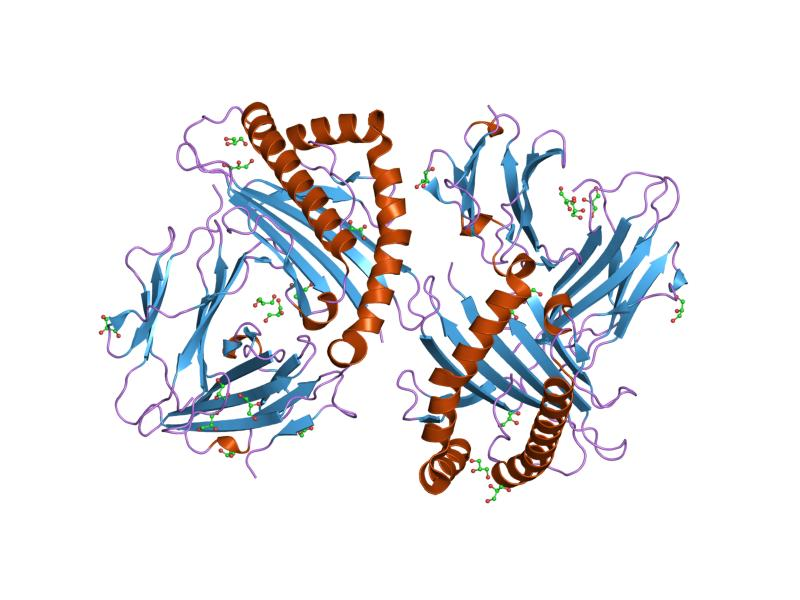

Identifiers
- Aliases: PMEL, D12S53E, ME20, ME20-M, ME20M, P1, P100, PMEL17, SI, SIL, SILV, gp100, premelanosome protein, HMB-45, HMB45
- External IDs: OMIM: 155550; MGI: 98301; GeneCards: PMEL
Available structures
PDB	Ortholog search: PDBe RCSB
PDB	List of PDB id codes 1TVB, 1TVH, 3CC5, 4IS6, 5EU6, 5EU4, 5EU3

Gene location (Human)
Chr.	Chromosome 12 (human)
Band	12q13.2	Start	55,954,105 bp
Band	12q13.2	End	55,973,317 bp

Gene location (Mouse)
Chr.	Chromosome 10 (mouse)
Band	10 D3|10 77.13 cM	Start	128,540,064 bp
Band	10 D3|10 77.13 cM	End	128,556,107 bp
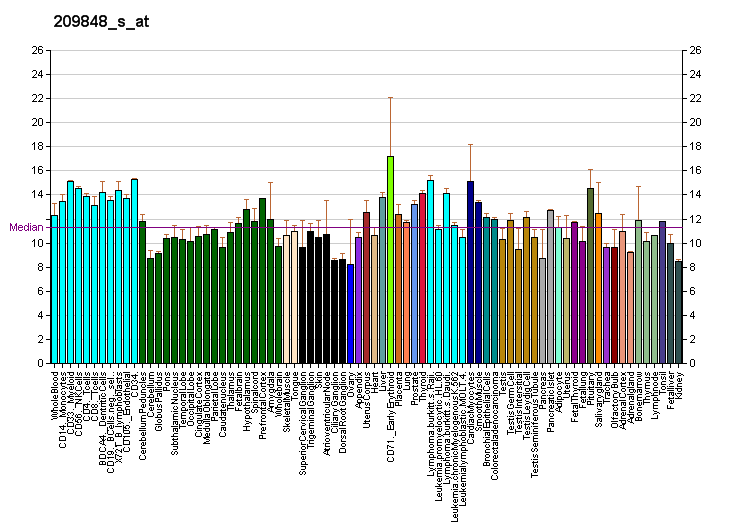
RNA expression pattern
Bgee	Human / Mouse (ortholog); Top expressed in: retinal pigment epithelium; skin of thigh; vulva; skin of abdomen; testicle; ectocervix; human penis; skin of arm; nipple; gonad / Top expressed in: iris; hair follicle; ciliary body; epithelium of lens; utricle; conjunctival fornix; spermatid; cornea; retinal pigment epithelium; vestibular sensory epithelium; More reference expression data
BioGPS	More reference expression data
Gene ontology
Molecular function	protein binding; identical protein binding
Cellular component	multivesicular body; membrane; extracellular region; multivesicular body membrane; integral component of membrane; endosome; plasma membrane; endoplasmic reticulum; melanosome; Golgi apparatus; endoplasmic reticulum membrane; integral component of plasma membrane
Biological process	melanin biosynthetic process; melanosome organization; developmental pigmentation
Sources:Amigo / QuickGO
Orthologs
Databases	NCBI: entry; OMA: entry
Species	Human	Mouse
Entrez	6490	20431
Ensembl	ENSG00000185664	ENSMUSG00000025359
UniProt	P40967	Q60696; Q9CZB2
RefSeq (mRNA)	NM_001200053; NM_001200054; NM_006928; NM_001320121; NM_001320122 NM_001384361	NM_021882
RefSeq (protein)	NP_001186982; NP_001186983; NP_001307050; NP_001307051; NP_008859	NP_068682
Location (UCSC)	Chr 12: 55.95 – 55.97 Mb	Chr 10: 128.54 – 128.56 Mb
PubMed search
- Wikidata
View/Edit Human	View/Edit Mouse

Melanocyte protein PMEL also known as premelanosome protein (PMEL), silver locus protein homolog (SILV) or Glycoprotein 100 (gp100), is a protein that in humans is encoded by the PMEL gene. Its gene product may be referred to as PMEL, silver, ME20, gp100 or Pmel17.

== Structure ==
MEL is a type I transmembrane glycoprotein that is expressed primarily in melanosomes, which are the melanin-producing organelles in melanocytes of pigment cells of the skin and eye, and in most malignant melanomas. It is 661 amino acids long, with a mass of 100 kDa.

The transmembrane form of PMEL is modified in the secretory pathway by elaboration of N-linked oligosaccharides and addition and modification of O-linked oligosaccharides. It is then targeted to precursors of the pigment organelle, the melanosome, where it is proteolytically processed to several small fragments.

Some of these fragments form non-pathological amyloid that assemble into sheets and form the striated pattern that underlies melanosomal ultrastructure. PMEL cleavage is mediated by several proteases including a proprotein convertase of the furin family, a "sheddase" that might include members of the a disintegrin and metalloproteinase (ADAM) family, and additional proteases in melanosomes or their precursors. After the amyloidogenic region is cleaved, the small remaining integral membrane fragment is digested by γ-secretase.

== Function ==
This protein is involved in melanosome maturation, including melanogenesis, melanosome biogenesis, and melanin polymerization.

The expression of the PMEL gene is regulated by the microphthalmia-associated transcription factor (MITF).

== Clinical significance ==
The gp100 protein is a melanoma antigen, i.e. a tumor-associated antigen.

The gp100 protein contains differentiation antigens and has been widely studied as a target for melanoma immunotherapy. Different sequences of the GP100 peptide could be used for immunization against tumors. According to a case study, modifications of GP100, such as GP100-209 and GP100-208, have shown a greater number of antigen-specific CTL's (cytotoxic T lymphocytes), which can target and kill cancer cells.

Short fragments of PMEL have been used to develop the gp100 cancer vaccine which is or contains gp100:209-217(210M).

Hydrophilic recombinant gp100 protein (HR-gp100) has been topically applied on human intact skin in vitro, and used as a vaccine in a mouse model. It was demonstrated that HR-gp100 permeates into human skin, and is processed and presented by human dendritic cells. In the mouse model, an HR-gp100-based vaccine triggered antigen-specific T cell responses, as shown by proliferation assays, ELISA and intracellular staining for IFN-γ.
