= Gp100:209-217(210M) =

Peptide cancer vaccine

Gp100:209-217(210M) is a synthetic peptide cancer vaccine consisting of amino acid residues 209 through 217 of the glycoprotein 100 (gp100) melanoma antigen, with a methionine substitution at position 210. It is often referred to as the gp100 cancer vaccine which can also include other peptides based on gp100 (for example gp100:280-288(288V)).

== Clinical trials ==
It gave good results in a trial for advanced melanoma when used in combination with interleukin-2. Another trial against Ipilimumab in advanced melanoma suggested Ipilimumab may be better than the gp100 vaccine alone.
