= Atypical adenomatous hyperplasia =

Atypical adenomatous hyperplasia is a subtype of pneumocytic hyperplasia in the lung. It can be a precursor lesion of in situ adenocarcinoma of the lung (bronchioloalveolar carcinoma). In prostate tissue biopsy, it can be confused for adenocarcinoma of the prostate. The needle biopsy rate is less than 1%.

== Pathology ==
=== Morphological differential diagnosis ===
- Multifocal micronodular pneumocyte hyperplasia (MMPH)
- in situ pulmonary adenocarcinoma (bronchioloalveolar carcinoma – BAC)

=== Variants ===
- multiple atypical adenomatous hyperplasia
- disseminated AAH

=== Histopathological images ===
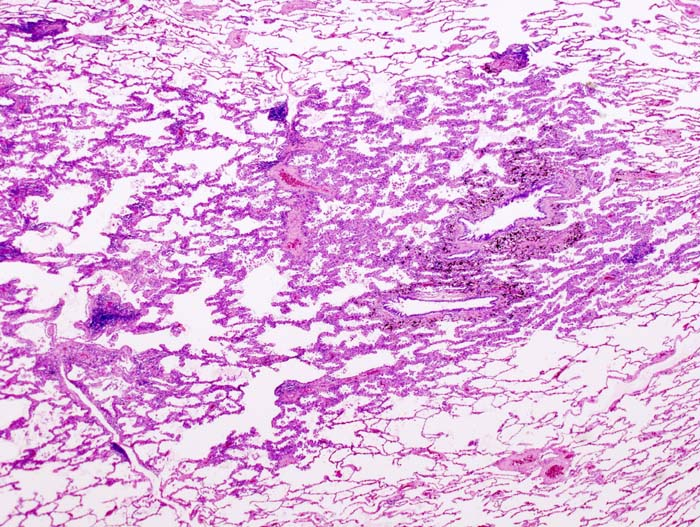

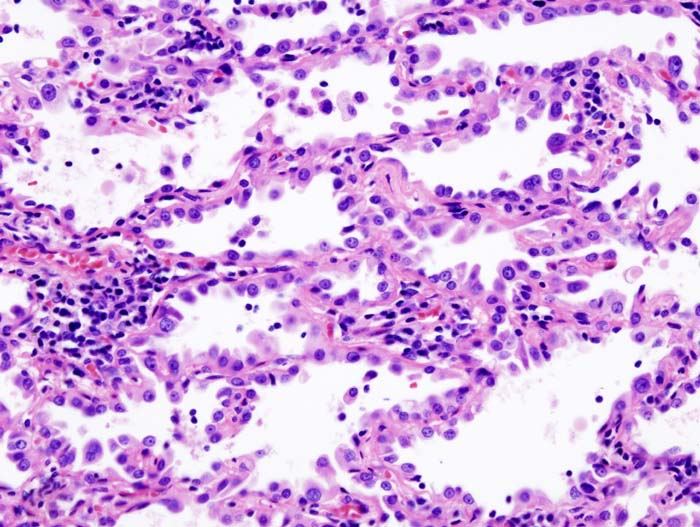

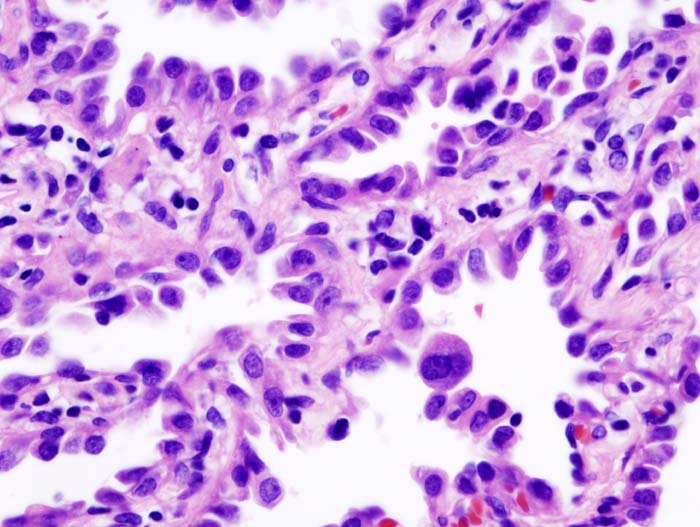

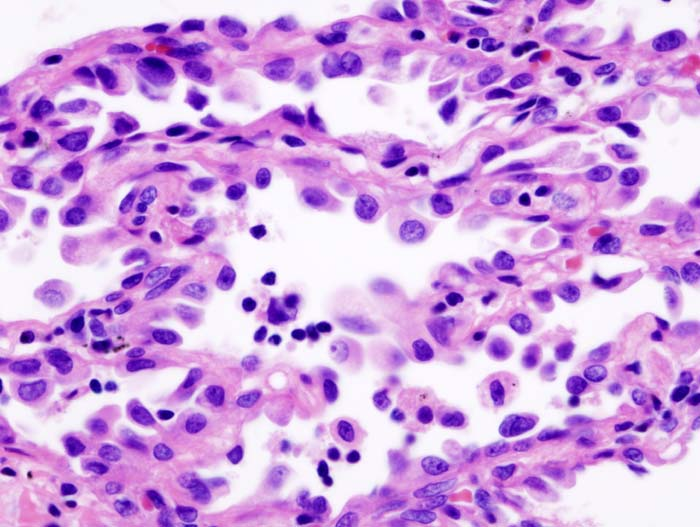

== See also ==
- EGFR
- KRAS
