= Ipilimumab =

Pharmaceutical drug

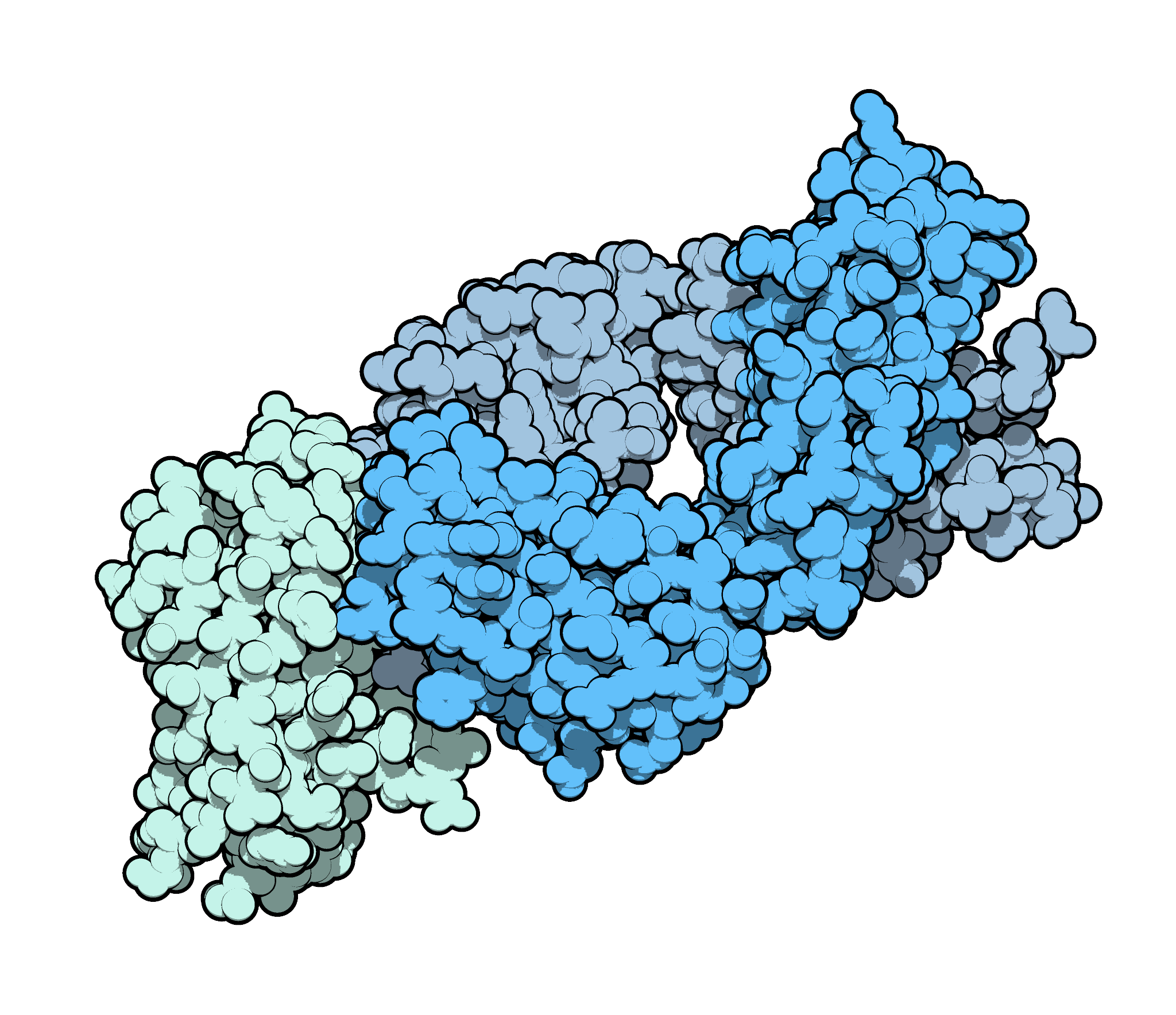
- Fab fragment of ipilimumab (blue) binding CTLA-4 (green). From PDB entry 5TRU.

Monoclonal antibody
- Type: Whole antibody
- Source: Human
- Target: CTLA-4

Clinical data
- Pronunciation: i pi lim′ ue mab
- Trade names: Yervoy
- Other names: BMS-734016, MDX-010, MDX-101
- AHFS/Drugs.com: Monograph
- MedlinePlus: a611023
- License data: US DailyMed: Ipilimumab
- Pregnancy category: AU: C
- Routes of administration: Intravenous
- ATC code: L01FX04 (WHO)

Legal status
- Legal status: AU: S4 (Prescription only); CA: ℞-only / Schedule D; UK: POM (Prescription only); US: ℞-only; EU: Rx-only; In general: ℞ (Prescription only)

Pharmacokinetic data
- Elimination half-life: 15 days

Identifiers
- CAS Number: 477202-00-9
- DrugBank: DB06186
- ChemSpider: none
- UNII: 6T8C155666
- KEGG: D04603
- ChEMBL: ChEMBL1789844

Chemical and physical data
- Formula: C_{6742}H_{9972}N_{1732}O_{2004}S_{40}
- Molar mass: 148634.46 g·mol^{−1}

Ipilimumab, sold under the brand name Yervoy, is a monoclonal antibody medication that works to activate the immune system by targeting CTLA-4, a protein receptor that downregulates the immune system.

Cytotoxic T lymphocytes (CTLs) can recognize and destroy cancer cells. However, an inhibitory mechanism interrupts this destruction. Ipilimumab turns off this inhibitory mechanism and boosts the body's immune response against cancer cells.

Ipilimumab was approved by the US Food and Drug Administration in March 2011, for the treatment of melanoma, renal cell carcinoma (RCC), colorectal cancer, hepatocellular carcinoma, non-small cell lung cancer (NSCLC), malignant pleural mesothelioma, and esophageal cancer. It is undergoing clinical trials for the treatment of bladder cancer and metastatic hormone-refractory prostate cancer.

The concept of using anti-CTLA4 antibodies to treat cancer was first developed by James P. Allison while he was director of the Cancer Research Laboratory at the University of California, Berkeley. Clinical development of anti-CTLA4 was initiated by Medarex, which was later acquired by Bristol-Myers Squibb. For his work in developing ipilimumab, Allison was awarded the Lasker Award in 2015. Allison later was the co-winner of the 2018 Nobel Prize in Physiology or Medicine.

== Medical uses ==
Ipilimumab was approved by the US Food and Drug Administration in March 2011, to treat people with late-stage melanoma that has spread or cannot be removed by surgery. It was later approved by the FDA in October 2015, for stage 3 patients as adjuvant therapy. On 1 February 2012, Health Canada approved ipilimumab for "treatment of unresectable or metastatic melanoma in patients who have failed or do not tolerate other systemic therapy for advanced disease." Ipilimumab was authorized in the European Union (EU), for second line treatment of metastatic melanoma in November 2012.

Nivolumab, in combination with ipilimumab is indicated for treating the following:

- intermediate or poor risk, previously untreated advanced renal cell carcinoma
- people aged 12 years and older with microsatellite instability-high or mismatch repair deficient metastatic colorectal cancer that has progressed following treatment with a fluoropyrimidine, oxaliplatin, and irinotecan.
- people with hepatocellular carcinoma who have been previously treated with sorafenib.
- a first-line treatment of adults with metastatic non-small cell lung cancer (NSCLC) whose tumors express PD-L1 (≥1%) as determined by an FDA-approved test.

In October 2020, the FDA approved the combination of nivolumab with ipilimumab for the first-line treatment of adults with malignant pleural mesothelioma that cannot be removed by surgery. This is the first drug regimen approved for mesothelioma in 16 years and the second FDA-approved systemic therapy for mesothelioma.

In April 2025, the FDA approved nivolumab with ipilimumab for people aged 12 years and older with unresectable or metastatic microsatellite instability-high or mismatch repair deficient colorectal cancer. The FDA also converted the accelerated approval to regular approval for single agent nivolumab for people aged 12 years and older with microsatellite instability-high or mismatch repair deficient metastatic colorectal cancer, that has progressed following fluoropyrimidine, oxaliplatin, and irinotecan.

== Adverse effects ==
A major drawback of ipilimumab therapy is its association with severe and potentially fatal immunological adverse effects due to T cell activation and proliferation, occurring in 10% to 20% of patients. Serious adverse effects include stomach pain, bloating, constipation, diarrhea, fever, trouble breathing, and urinating problems. A "risk evaluation and mitigation strategy" informs prescribers of the potential risks.

Between 5.7% and 9.1% of individuals treated with ipilimumab develop checkpoint inhibitor induced colitis.

Individual cases of severe neurologic disorders following ipilimumab have been observed, including acute inflammatory demyelination polyneuropathy and an ascending motor paralysis, and myasthenia gravis.

== Interactions ==
The combination of ipilimumab with either leflunomide or vemurafenib may lead to increased hepatotoxicity.

== Mechanism of action ==
T lymphocytes can recognize and destroy cancer cells. However, an inhibitory mechanism interrupts this destruction. Ipilimumab turns off this inhibitory mechanism and allows the lymphocytes to continue to destroy cancer cells.

Cancer cells produce antigens, which the immune system can use to identify them. These antigens are recognized by dendritic cells that present the antigens to cytotoxic T lymphocytes (CTLs) in the lymph nodes. The CTLs recognize the cancer cells by those antigens and destroy them. However, along with the antigens, the dendritic cells present an inhibitory signal. That signal binds to a receptor, cytotoxic T lymphocyte-associated antigen 4 (CTLA-4), on the CTL and turns off the cytotoxic reaction. This allows the cancer cells to survive.

Ipilimumab binds to CTLA-4, blocking the inhibitory signal, which allows the CTLs to destroy the cancer cells. In 2014 a study indicated that the antibody works by allowing the patients' T cells to target a greater variety of antigens rather than by increasing the number attacking a single antigen.

== Pharmacokinetics ==
The elimination half-life of ipilimumab is about 15 days.

== History ==
Following the 1987 cloning of CTLA-4 in mice, its conservation in humans and similarities with CD28 were soon noticed. CD28 at that time was a recently identified "T cell costimulatory" molecule important for T cell activation. Anti-CTLA-4 blockade, the invention that gave rise to ipilimumab, was conceived by Allison and Krummel along with CTLA-4's inhibitory role in T cell activation. They were able to demonstrate that CTLA-4 signaling in T cells inhibited T cell responses. They then injected intact antibodies and demonstrated that CTLA-4 blockade enhanced T cell responses in mice responding to vaccines and to super antigens. Leach, a new postdoctoral fellow, was tasked by Allison with applying these in tumor models. Antibody-treated mice showed significantly less cancer growth than the controls.

Bluestone and Linsley separately studied the similarities between CD28 and CTLA-4. Bluestone's lab published studies, one together with Krummel and Allison, for in vitro studies of CTLA-4 function. In collaboration with Mark Jenkins, they were able to see effects of anti-CTLA-4 antibodies in vivo in an immunization setting, but did not effectively carry this into tumor biology. Linsley and colleagues had made antibodies against CTLA-4 three years prior to those of Krummel/Allison or Walunas/Bluestone. They concluded that the molecule functioned similarly to CD28 and was a "positive costimulator". They apparently did not pursue CTLA-4 tumor targeting, although BMS licensed the Allison/Leach/Krummel patent through their acquisition of Medarex and the fully humanized antibody MDX010, which later became ipilimumab.

=== Clinical trial history ===
In the 2000s, ipilimumab clinical trials were under way on patients with melanoma, renal cell carcinoma, prostate cancers, urothelial carcinoma and ovarian cancer. By 2007, there were two fully human anti CTLA-4 monoclonal antibodies in advanced clinical trials. Ipilimumab, which is an IgG1 isotype, and tremelimumab (from Pfizer) which is an IgG2 isotype.

==== Melanoma ====
In December 2007, Bristol-Myers Squibb and Medarex released the results of three studies on ipilimumab for melanoma. The three studies tested 487 patients with advanced skin cancer. One of the three studies failed to meet its primary goal of shrinking tumors in at least 10.0% of the study's 155 patients. Side effects included rashes, diarrhea, and hepatitis.

In 2010, a study was presented that showed a median survival of ten months in advanced melanoma patients treated with ipilimumab, compared with 6.4 months for those treated with gp100, an experimental vaccine (n=676), and 10.1 months for those treated with both the vaccine and ipilimumab. The phase III clinical studies on the drug were controversial for their unconventional use of a control arm (as opposed to using a placebo or standard treatment). Ipilimumab gained FDA approval in March 2011.

==== Prostate cancer ====
In 2008/09 Medarex performed a phase I/II dose escalation clinical trial of ipilimumab in metastatic hormone-refractory prostate cancer (HRPC). Some of the patients with advanced prostate cancer had their tumors drastically shrink, promoting further trials.

In June 2009, the Mayo Clinic reported two prostate cancer patients involved in a phase II study using MDX-010 therapy who had been told initially that their condition was inoperable but had their tumors shrunk by the drug such that operation was possible and are now cancer-free as a result. This press report was criticized as premature and inaccurate, because the clinical trials were still at an early stage and were run alongside other treatments, which could have been the main reason for the tumor shrinkage. Thus, it was too early to say whether ipilimumab made any difference.

In 2016, a phase II study using ipilimumab and nivolumab in AR-V7-expressing metastatic castration-resistant prostate cancer was opened. AR-V7 is an androgen receptor splice variant that can be detected in circulating tumor cells of metastatic prostate cancer patients.

==== Lung cancer ====
CHECKMATE-227 tested the combination of nivolumab and ipilimumab in patients with stage IV or recurrent non-small cell lung cancer (NSCLC) without previous treatment. Patients with a PD-L1 expression level of 1% or more were randomized in a 1:1:1 ratio to receive nivolumab plus ipilimumab, nivolumab alone, or chemotherapy. The chemotherapy used was cisplatin or carboplatin, combined with gemcitabine for patient with squamous cell NSCLC, or pemetrexed for patients with nonsquamous disease. The overall survival (OS) was 17.1, 15.7 and 14.9 months, respectively. The patients who had a PD-L1 expression level of less than 1% were randomly assigned in a 1:1:1 ratio to receive nivolumab plus ipilimumab, nivolumab plus chemotherapy, or chemotherapy. The OS was 17.2, 15.2 and 12.2 months, respectively.

CHECKMATE-9LA randomized patients with stage IV NSCLC, to nivolumab 360 mg Q3W + ipilimumab 1 mg/kg Q6W + two cycles of chemotherapy or 4 cycles of chemotherapy alone. The chemotherapy used was Cisplatin or Carboplatin combined with Pemetrexed or Paclitaxel. The data were presented in an abstract format and as a lecture during the American Society of Clinical Oncology (ASCO) 2020 annual meeting. Median OS was 15.6 and 10.9 months, in the immunotherapy-chemotherapy and the chemotherapy only groups, respectively.

==== Urothelial cancer, including cancer of the bladder, urethra, ureters and renal pelvis ====
A phase II clinical trial was first reported in 2015. Thirty-six patients were treated with chemotherapy, adding ipilimumab after the second 21-day cycle. Though the study did not meet its primary endpoint, a significant expansion of circulating CD4 cells was noted upon addition of ipilimumab, which correlated with improved survival, especially in patients with deleterious somatic DNA damage response mutations.

==== Combination trials ====
===== Advanced melanoma =====
In 2013, a trial was running that compared ipilimumab alone against ipilimumab in combination with nivolumab. The response rate (tumours shrinking by at least 30%) was 58% for the combination, 44% for nivolumab alone, and 19% for ipilimumab alone. This combination gained approval for melanoma by the US Food and Drug Administration in October 2015.

In March 2014, an open-label, randomized, two agent, single center trial started combining ipilimumab with phosphatidylserine-targeting immunotherapy bavituximab for the treatment of advanced melanoma. The number of treated patients in arm A (ipilimumab plus bavituximab) was to be 16, with 8 in arm B (ipilimumab only). The trial was terminated in April 2016 due to low enrollment. Previous, preclinical studies showed that PS targeting antibodies (such as bavituximab) enhance the anti-tumor activity of anti-CTLA-4 and anti-PD-1 antibodies. Tumor growth inhibition correlates with infiltration of immune cells in tumors and induction of adaptive immunity. The combination of these mechanisms promotes strong, localized, anti-tumor responses without the side-effects of systemic immune activation.
