= List of drugs: H–He =

This multi-page article lists pharmaceutical drugs alphabetically by name. Many drugs have more than one name and, therefore, the same drug may be listed more than once. Brand names and generic names are differentiated by capitalizing brand names.

See also the list of the top 100 bestselling branded drugs, ranked by sales.

Abbreviations are used in the list as follows:

- INN = International nonproprietary name
- BAN = British Approved Name
- USAN = United States Adopted Name
- Two-letter codes for countries

Lists of drugs
1–9 | A | B | C | D | E | F | G | H | I | J | K | L | M | N | O | P | Q | R | S | T | U | V | W | X | Y | Z

Ha–He | Hf–Hz

== h ==
- H-Cort
- H.P. Acthar Gel
- H.R.-50

== ha ==
=== hab-had ===
- Habitrol
- hachimycin (INN)
- Hadlima

=== hal ===
==== hala-half ====
- halazepam (INN)
- halazone (INN)
- halcinonide (INN)
- Halcion
- Haldol
- Haldrone
- haletazole (INN)
- Halfan
- Halflytely
- Halimatoz

==== halo ====
- halocarban (INN)
- halocortolone (INN)
- halofantrine (INN)
- halofenate (INN)
- halofuginone (INN)
- Halog
- halometasone (INN)
- halonamine (INN)
- halopemide (INN)
- halopenium chloride (INN)
- haloperidol (INN)
- halopredone (INN)
- haloprogesterone (INN)
- haloprogin (INN)
- Halotestin
- Halotex
- halothane (INN)
- haloxazolam (INN)
- haloxon (INN)

=== ham-har ===
- hamycin (INN)
- Harliku
- Harmonyl

== hb ==
- HBI-3000

== hc ==
- HC (Hydrocortisone)

== he ==
=== hea-hem ===
- Head & Shoulders Conditioner
- Heavy Solution Nupercaine
- Hectorol
- hedaquinium chloride (INN)
- Hedulin
- Hefiya
- Helicosol
- Helidac
- heliomycin (INN)
- Hemabate
- Hemacord
- Hemgenix
- Hemlibra
- hemoglobin crosfumaril (INN)
- hemoglobin glutamer-256 (USAN)
- hemoglobin raffimer (USAN)
- Hemophyt
- Hemsol-HC

=== hep-het ===
- Hep Flush Kit
- Hep-Lock
- heparin sodium (INN)
- Hepatamine 8%
- Hepatasol 8%
- Hepatolite
- Hepcludex
- Hepflush-10
- hepronicate (INN)
- Hepsera
- heptabarb (INN)
- Heptalac
- heptaminol (INN)
- heptaverine (INN)
- heptolamide (INN)
- Hepzato
- hepzidine (INN)
- Herceptin
- Herceptin Hylecta
- Hercessi
- Hernexeos
- heroin
- Herplex
- Herwenda
- Herzuma
- hetacillin (INN)
- hetaflur (INN)
- heteronium bromide (INN)
- Hetrazan

=== hex ===
==== hexa ====
- Hexa-Betalin
- Hexa-Germ

===== hexab-hexal =====
- Hexabrix
- hexachlorophene (INN)
- hexacyprone (INN)
- hexadiline (INN)
- hexadimethrine bromide (INN)
- Hexadrol
- hexafluronium bromide (INN)
- hexafocon B (USAN)
- Hexal Clofeme (Hexal Australia) [Au]. Redirects to clotrimazole.
- Hexal Clotreme (Hexal Australia) [Au]. Redirects to clotrimazole.
- Hexal Comfarol Plus (Hexal Australia) [Au].
- Hexal Diclac (Hexal Australia) [Au]. Redirects to diclofenac.
- Hexalen (US Bioscience)
- Hexal PI Antiseptic Ointment (Hexal Australia) [Au]. Redirects to povidone-iodine.
- Hexal Ranitic (Hexal Australia) [Au]. Redirects to ranitidine.

===== hexam-hexas =====
- hexamethonium bromide (INN)
- hexamidine (INN)
- hexaminolevulinate (USAN)
- hexapradol (INN)
- hexaprofen (INN)
- hexapropymate (INN)
- Hexascrub
- hexasonium iodide (INN)

==== hexc-hexy ====
- hexcarbacholine bromide (INN)
- hexedine (INN)
- hexestrol (INN)
- hexetidine (INN)
- hexobarbital (INN)
- hexobendine (INN)
- hexocyclium metilsulfate (INN)
- hexoprenaline (INN)
- hexopyrronium bromide (INN)
- hexylcaine (INN)
