= Amivantamab/hyaluronidase =

Medication

Combination of
- Amivantamab: Bispecific epidermal growth factor receptor (EGFR)-directed and hepatocyte growth factor receptor (MET)-directed antibody
- Hyaluronidase: Endoglycosidase

Clinical data
- Trade names: Rybrevant Faspro
- AHFS/Drugs.com: rybrevant-faspro
- License data: US DailyMed: Amivantamab and hyaluronidase
- Routes of administration: Subcutaneous
- ATC code: None

Legal status
- Legal status: US: ℞-only

Amivantamab/hyaluronidase, sold under the brand name Rybrevant Faspro, is a fixed-dose combination medication used for the treatment of non-small cell lung cancer. It contains amivantamab, a bispecific epidermal growth factor receptor (EGFR)-directed and hepatocyte growth factor receptor (MET)-directed antibody; and hyaluronidase, an endoglycosidase. It is given by subcutaneous infusion.

Amivantamab/hyaluronidase was approved for medical use in the United States in December 2025.

== Medical uses ==
Amivantamab/hyaluronidase is indicated in combination with lazertinib for the first-line treatment of adults with locally advanced or metastatic non-small cell lung cancer with epidermal growth factor receptor (EGFR) exon 19 deletions or exon 21 L858R substitution mutations, as detected by an FDA-approved test; in combination with carboplatin and pemetrexed for the treatment of adults with locally advanced or metastatic non-small cell lung cancer with EGFR exon 19 deletions or exon 21 L858R substitution mutations, whose disease has progressed on or after treatment with an EGFR tyrosine kinase inhibitor; in combination with carboplatin and pemetrexed for the first-line treatment of adults with locally advanced or metastatic non-small cell lung cancer with EGFR exon 20 insertion mutations, as detected by an FDA-approved test; as a single agent for the treatment of adults with locally advanced or metastatic non-small cell lung cancer with EGFR exon 20 insertion mutations, as detected by an FDA approved test, whose disease has progressed on or after platinum-based chemotherapy.

== Adverse effects ==
The US prescribing information includes warnings and precautions for hypersensitivity and administration-related reactions, interstitial lung disease/pneumonitis, venous thromboembolic events with concomitant use with lazertinib, dermatologic adverse reactions, ocular toxicity, and embryo-fetal toxicity.

== History ==
The subcutaneous injection of amivantamab and hyaluronidase was evaluated in PALOMA-3, a randomized, open-label, multi-center, multi-regional trial in adults with locally advanced or metastatic non-small cell lung cancer (NSCLC) with EGFR-exon 19 deletions or exon 21 L858R substitution mutations. A total of 418 participants were randomized (1:1) to receive either subcutaneous amivantamab and hyaluronidase plus lazertinib or intravenous amivantamab plus lazertinib.

The safety profile of the subcutaneous amivantamab arm was generally similar to the safety profile of the intravenous amivantamab IV arm in PALOMA-3. One exception is that the incidence of systemic administration reactions (ARRs) for subcutaneous amivantamab SC was lower than the incidence of infusion related reactions (IRRs) for intravenous amivantamab. The incidence of systemic ARRs of any grade was 13% for subcutaneous amivantamab compared to 66% IRRs for intravenous amivantamab.

== Society and culture ==
=== Legal status ===
Amivantamab/hyaluronidase was approved for medical use in the United States in December 2025.

=== Names ===
Amivantamab/hyaluronidase is sold under the brand name Rybrevant Faspro.
