= Efgartigimod alfa/hyaluronidase =

Combination medication

Combination of
- Efgartigimod alfa: Neonatal Fc receptor blocker
- Hyaluronidase: Endoglycosidase

Clinical data
- Trade names: Vyvgart Hytrulo
- Other names: ARGX-113, Efgartigimod alfa/hyaluronidase-qvfc
- License data: US DailyMed: Efgartigimod alfa hyaluronidase
- Routes of administration: Subcutaneous
- ATC code: None

Legal status
- Legal status: US: ℞-only

Identifiers
- KEGG: D12684

Efgartigimod alfa/hyaluronidase, sold under the brand name Vyvgart Hytrulo, is a coformulation medication used for the treatment of generalized myasthenia gravis and chronic inflammatory demyelinating polyneuropathy. It contains efgartigimod alfa, a neonatal Fc receptor blocker, and hyaluronidase (human recombinant), an endoglycosidase.

Efgartigimod alfa/hyaluronidase may increase the risk of infection, including urinary tract infection and respiratory tract infections. In clinical trials, hypersensitivity reactions, including rash, angioedema (swelling), dyspnea (shortness of breath), and urticaria (itchy welts) were observed in people treated with efgartigimod alfa. The most common adverse reactions (≥ 10%) of people with myasthenia gravis treated with efgartigimod alfa were respiratory tract infections, headache, and urinary tract infection.

It was approved for medical use in the United States in June 2023.

== Medical uses ==
Efgartigimod alfa/hyaluronidase is indicated for the treatment of generalized myasthenia gravis in adults who are anti-acetylcholine receptor antibody positive.

In June 2024, the US Food and Drug Administration (FDA) expanded the indication for the combination to include the treatment of chronic inflammatory demyelinating polyneuropathy in adults.

== History ==
The effectiveness of the combination for the treatment of adults with chronic inflammatory demyelinating polyneuropathy was established in a two stage, multicenter study (Study 3; NCT04281472). Study 3 included an open-label period (stage A) to identify people who had evidence of improvement with the use of Vyvgart Hytrulo, who then entered a randomized, double-blind, placebo-controlled, withdrawal period (stage B).
