= E. Sally Ward =

Biochemistry researcher

Sally Ward FRS
- Born: Elizabeth Sally Ward
- Education: University of Cambridge
- Awards: Royal Society Wolfson Research Merit Award (2018)
- Scientific career
- Fields: Immunology; Cancer Biology; Antibody Engineering; Antibody Therapeutics
- Workplaces: Texas A&M University; University of Texas Southwestern Medical Center; University of Cambridge; University of Southampton
- Thesis: Molecular genetics of an insectidal delta-endotoxin from Bacillus thuringiensis var israelensis. (1985)
- Doctoral advisor: David J. Ellar
- Website: www.wardoberlab.com/lab-members/sally-ward/

Elizabeth Sally Ward FRS is currently the Director of Translational Immunology at the Centre for Cancer Immunology in the University of Southampton. She was elected Fellow of the Royal Society in 2022 in recognition of her research related to the receptor, FcRn, and the development of antibody therapeutics.

== Early life and education ==
Ward was an undergraduate student at the University of Cambridge, where she studied the Natural Sciences Tripos with a focus on biochemistry. She remained at Cambridge for her doctoral research, working under the supervision of David J. Ellar at Gonville and Caius College, Cambridge. Her PhD research investigated the genetics of delta endotoxin from Bacillus thuringiensis israelensis.

== Research and career ==
Ward remained at Cambridge as a Junior Research Fellow at Gonville and Caius College and subsequently as the Stanley Elmore Senior Research fellow at Sidney Sussex College, Cambridge. During this time, she carried out research in the Department of Biochemistry, and subsequently worked with the 2018 Nobel Laureate, Sir Gregory Winter, on antibody repertoire technology at the MRC Laboratory of Molecular Biology in Cambridge.

In 1990, Ward moved to the United States. She joined the University of Texas Southwestern Medical Center, where she was a member of the founding faculty of the Centre for Immunology. In 2004, she was awarded the Paul and Betty Meek-FINA Professorship. She moved to the Texas A&M University Health Sciences University in 2014. In 2018, Ward returned to the United Kingdom, joining the University of Southampton as Professor of Molecular Immunology and Director of Translational Immunology.

Ward's primary research interests have been directed towards understanding the factors that regulate the persistence and transport of antibodies in the body. This has relevance to the maintenance of immunity, in addition to the successful delivery of therapeutic antibodies. In 1996, Ward's laboratory addressed a longstanding question in immunology by identifying the neonatal Fc receptor, FcRn, as the regulator of Immunoglobulin G (IgG) levels and transport in the body. The identification of FcRn as a critical player in these processes also confirmed the 30-year old Brambell hypothesis (F.W.R. Brambell) that connected IgG transport and persistence.

Ward's research has involved the use of molecular and cellular approaches to establish the mechanism by which Fcrn achieves the regulation of antibody persistence and levels. To investigate the cellular processes involving FcRn, in collaboration with Raimund Ober, Ward developed advanced microscopy techniques to track FcRn and IgG in live cells. Ward's molecular and cellular studies have been used to inform the development of new approaches for antibody drug development.

The knowledge of the central role of FcRn in regulating antibody levels was used to develop an approach to extend the in vivo persistence of antibodies, namely half-life extension (HLE). This approach leads to substantial increases in the longevity of antibody-based drugs, allowing lower dosing frequencies. HLE has been widely implemented by biopharma and is used in several clinically approved antibody therapeutics (e.g.), with many more in ongoing clinical trials.

Ward's identification of the role of FcRn in regulating IgG levels has led to the development of FcRn antagonists (or inhibitors) that lower antibody levels. Specifically, Ward developed an engineered antibody, called an Abdeg (for antibody that enhances IgG degradation), to inhibit FcRn. The Abdeg technology was licensed to the biopharma company, argenx, and led to the first approved FcRn antagonist, efgartigimod. Efgartigimod is approved to treat several autoantibody-mediated diseases, and its approval has been followed by that of additional FcRn antagonists developed by other companies.

To address the need for treatments for autoimmune disease that are not immunosuppressive, Ward's laboratory pioneered an approach for the specific removal of antibodies that cause disease in autoimmunity or other antibody-mediated pathologies. This has been named Seldeg technology (for selective degradation).

Ward's research has also involved the use of cell biological studies to generate engineered antibody-drug conjugates (ADCs) that are more effective in delivering cytotoxic drugs to tumor cells for the treatment of cancer. This approach, called ALTA technology, is expected to lead to reduced side-effects due to undesirable toxicities that can currently limit the effective use of ADCs to treat cancer.

=== Awards and honours ===
- Stanley Elmore Senior Research Fellowship (Sidney Sussex College, Cambridge)
- 2018 Royal Society Wolfson Research Merit Award
- 2022–2023 President of The Antibody Society
- 2022 Elected Fellow of the Royal Society
- 2025 International Society of Molecular Recognition Award in Affinity Technology

== Selected publications ==
- Binding activities of a repertoire of single immunoglobulin variable domains secreted from Escherichia coli
- Abnormally short serum half-lives of IgG in beta 2-microglobulin-deficient mice
- Increasing the serum persistence of an IgG fragment by random mutagenesis
- Engineering the Fc region of immunoglobulin G to modulate in vivo antibody levels
- Engineered clearing agents for the selective depletion of antigen-specific antibodies
- Engineering a HER2-specific antibody-drug conjugate to increase lysosomal delivery and therapeutic efficacy

== Videos ==
- What is FcRn and What Does It Do? (YouTube)
- FcRn and the Long Half-Life of IgG Antibodies (YouTube)
- What is an FcRn Blocker and How Does It Work? (YouTube)
