= Nivolumab/hyaluronidase =

Medication

Combination of
- Nivolumab: Programmed death receptor-1-blocking antibody
- Hyaluronidase: Endoglycosidase

Clinical data
- Trade names: Opdivo Qvantig
- Other names: Nivolumab/hyaluronidase-nvhy
- AHFS/Drugs.com: Opdivo-qvantig
- MedlinePlus: a625029
- License data: US DailyMed: Nivolumab and hyaluronidase
- Routes of administration: Subcutaneous injection
- ATC code: None

Legal status
- Legal status: US: ℞-only

Nivolumab/hyaluronidase, sold under the brand name Opdivo Qvantig, is a fixed-dose combination anti-cancer medication used for the treatment of various forms of cancer. Nivolumab/hyaluronidase contains nivolumab, a programmed death receptor-1 (PD-1)–blocking monoclonal antibody; and hyaluronidase, an endoglycosidase. It is given by subcutaneous injection.

Nivolumab/hyaluronidase was approved for medical use in the United States in December 2024.

== Medical uses ==
In December 2024, the US Food and Drug Administration (FDA) approved the combination of nivolumab and hyaluronidase across approved adult, solid tumor nivolumab indications as monotherapy, monotherapy maintenance following completion of hyaluronidase plus ipilimumab combination therapy, or in combination with chemotherapy or cabozantinib. The approval includes indications for renal cell carcinoma, melanoma, non–small cell lung cancer, head and neck squamous cell carcinoma, urothelial carcinoma, colorectal cancer, hepatocellular carcinoma, esophageal carcinoma, gastric cancer, gastroesophageal junction cancer, and esophageal adenocarcinoma.

== History ==
The subcutaneous injection of nivolumab and hyaluronidase was evaluated in CHECKMATE-67T (NCT04810078), a multicenter, randomized, open-label trial in participants with advanced or metastatic clear cell renal cell carcinoma who received no more than two prior systemic treatment regimens. A total of 495 participants were randomized to receive either subcutaneous nivolumab and hyaluronidase or intravenous nivolumab.

== Society and culture ==
=== Legal status ===
Nivolumab/hyaluronidase was approved for medical use in the United States in December 2024.
