= Batoclimab =

Monoclonal antibody
- Type: ?

Identifiers
- CAS Number: 2187430-05-1
- UNII: C98V9UMX3D

Batoclimab (also known as HBM9161 or HL161) is a fully human monoclonal antibody administered by subcutaneous injection. It works by inhibiting the neonatal fragment crystallizable receptor, which leads to a reduction in antibodies of the thyrotropin receptor. It is being developed to treat myasthenia gravis and thyroid eye disease.
