= Pertuzumab/trastuzumab/hyaluronidase =

Combination drug

Combination of
- Pertuzumab: HER2/neu receptor antagonist
- Trastuzumab: HER2/neu receptor antagonist
- Hyaluronidase: Endoglycosidase

Clinical data
- Trade names: Phesgo
- AHFS/Drugs.com: Monograph
- License data: US DailyMed: Phesgo
- Pregnancy category: Not recommended
- Routes of administration: Subcutaneous
- ATC code: L01XY02 (WHO)

Legal status
- Legal status: CA: ℞-only / Schedule D; US: ℞-only; EU: Rx-only

Identifiers
- CAS Number: 1688675-85-5
- KEGG: D11934

Pertuzumab/trastuzumab/hyaluronidase, sold under the brand name Phesgo, is a fixed-dose combination medication to treat adults with HER2-positive breast cancer that has spread to other parts of the body, and for treatment of adults with early HER2-positive breast cancer. It contains pertuzumab, trastuzumab, and hyaluronidase–zzxf. It is injected under the skin via subcutaneous injection in the thigh. In the European Union, Phesgo contains the active ingredients pertuzumab and trastuzumab along with the enzyme vorhyaluronidase alfa.

The most common side effects include alopecia (hair loss), nausea, diarrhea, anemia (reduced number of red blood cells) and asthenia (lack of energy). It can cause worsening of chemotherapy induced neutropenia (low level of white blood cells). It may cause harm to a developing fetus or a newborn baby.

HER2-positive breast cancer, which makes up approximately one-fifth of breast cancers, has too much of a protein called human epidermal growth factor receptor 2 (HER2), which promotes the growth of cancer cells. Pertuzumab and trastuzumab bind to sites on HER2 and disrupt signaling to stop cancer cell growth.

== Medical uses ==
The fixed-dose combination is indicated for the treatment of early breast cancer (EBC):

- Use in combination with chemotherapy for:
  - the neoadjuvant treatment of adults with HER2-positive, locally advanced, inflammatory, or early stage breast cancer (either greater than two cm in diameter or node positive) as part of a complete treatment regimen for early breast cancer;
  - the adjuvant treatment of adults with HER2-positive early breast cancer at high risk of recurrence.

and for the treatment of metastatic breast cancer (MBC):

- Use in combination with docetaxel for the treatment of adults with HER2-positive metastatic breast cancer (MBC) who have not received prior anti-HER2 therapy or chemotherapy for metastatic disease.

== Adverse effects ==
The FDA label includes a boxed warning about the risk of potential heart failure, fetal harm, and lung toxicity.

== History ==
The fixed-dose combination of pertuzumab, trastuzumab, and hyaluronidase was approved for medical use in the United States in June 2020.

The FDA's approval was based on the results of a non-inferiority study in participants with HER2-positive early breast cancer, which demonstrated the fixed-dose combination of pertuzumab, trastuzumab, and hyaluronidase had comparable efficacy and safety as IV pertuzumab and IV trastuzumab, except for administration-related reactions, which were higher with the fixed-dose combination due to the subcutaneous route of administration.

Efficacy was investigated in FeDeriCa (NCT03493854), an open-label, multicenter, randomized trial enrolling 500 participants with operable or locally advanced HER2-positive breast cancer. Participants were randomized to receive neoadjuvant chemotherapy with concurrent administration of either the fixed-dose combination of pertuzumab, trastuzumab, and hyaluronidase or intravenous pertuzumab and intravenous trastuzumab during the neoadjuvant and adjuvant therapies.

The primary endpoint of FeDeriCa was non-inferiority of cycle 7 pertuzumab serum trough concentration comparing the fixed-dose combination of pertuzumab, trastuzumab, and hyaluronidase to intravenous pertuzumab. Secondary endpoints included cycle 7 trastuzumab serum trough concentration, pathological complete response (pCR), and safety. The fixed-dose combination showed non-inferior pertuzumab and trastuzumab serum trough concentrations compared to intravenous pertuzumab and trastuzumab. The pCR rate was 59.7% (95% CI: 53.3, 65.8) in the pertuzumab/trastuzumab/hyaluronidase arm and 59.5% (95% CI: 53.2, 65.6) in the intravenous pertuzumab and intravenous trastuzumab arm. The safety profile of the fixed-dose combination of pertuzumab, trastuzumab, and hyaluronidase is comparable to intravenous pertuzumab and trastuzumab, except for increased administration-related reactions.

The FDA granted approval of Phesgo to Genentech Inc.

== Society and culture ==
=== Legal status ===
On 12 November 2020, the Committee for Medicinal Products for Human Use (CHMP) of the European Medicines Agency (EMA) adopted a positive opinion, recommending the granting of a marketing authorization for the medicinal product Phesgo, intended for the treatment of early and metastatic breast cancer. The applicant for this medicinal product is Roche Registration GmbH. Phesgo was approved for medical use in the European Union in December 2020.
