= Endoglycosidase H =

Endo-beta-N-acetylglucosaminidase

Identifiers
- Aliases: Endo-FspIPR016289Endoglycosidase Hdi-N-acetylchitobiosyl beta-N-acetylglucosaminidaseendo-N-acetyl-beta-glucosaminidaseendo-beta-acetylglucosaminidaseendo-beta-(1->4)-N-acetylglucosaminidaseN,N'-diacetylchitobiosyl beta-N-acetylglucosaminidaseendo-beta-N-acetylglucosaminidase Fendo-beta-N-acetylglucosaminidase Lendo-N-acetyl-beta-D-glucosaminidaseendoglycosidase Smannosyl-glycoprotein 1,4-N-acetamidodeoxy-beta-D-glycohydrolasemannosyl-glycoprotein endo-beta-N-acetylglucosamidaseendo-beta-N-acetylglucosaminidase Hglycopeptide-D-mannosyl-4-N-(N-acetyl-D-glucosaminyl)2-asparagine 1,4-N-acetyl-beta-glucosaminohydrolaseendo-beta-N-acetylglucosaminidase Dglycopeptide-D-mannosyl-N4-(N-acetyl-D-glucosaminyl)2-asparagine 1,4-N-acetyl-beta-glucosaminohydrolase
- External IDs: GeneCards:
Orthologs
Databases	n/a
Species	Human	Mouse
Entrez	n/a	n/a
Ensembl	n/a	n/a
UniProt	n a	n/a
RefSeq (mRNA)	n/a	n/a
RefSeq (protein)	n/a	n/a
Location (UCSC)	n/a	n/a
PubMed search	n/a	n/a
- Wikidata
View/Edit Human

Mannosyl-glycoprotein endo-β-N-acetylglucosaminidase

Identifiers
- EC no.: 3.2.1.96
- CAS no.: 37278-88-9
- Alt. names: Endo-β-N-acetylglucosaminidase H, N,N′-diacetylchitobiosyl β-N-acetylglucosaminidase, mannosyl-glycoprotein endo-β-N-acetylglucosamidase, di-N-acetylchitobiosyl β-N-acetylglucosaminidase, endo-β-acetylglucosaminidase, endo-β-(1→4)-N-acetylglucosaminidase, mannosyl-glycoprotein 1,4-N-acetamidodeoxy-β-D-glycohydrolase, endoglycosidase S, endo-N-acetyl-β-D-glucosaminidase, endo-N-acetyl-β-glucosaminidase, endo-β-N-acetylglucosaminidase D, endo-β-N-acetylglucosaminidase F, endo-β-N-acetylglucosaminidase H, endo-β-N-acetylglucosaminidase L, glycopeptide-D-mannosyl-4-N-(N-acetyl-D-glucosaminyl)2-asparagine 1,4-N-acetyl-β-glucosaminohydrolase, endoglycosidase H

Databases
- BRENDA: enzyme data
- ExPASy: NiceZyme view
- KEGG: enzyme entry
- MetaCyc: metabolic pathway
- Rhea: reactions
- PDB structures: RCSB PDB PDBe PDBsum
Search
- PMC: articles
- PubMed: articles
- NCBI: proteins

The enzyme mannosyl-glycoprotein endo-β-N-acetylglucosaminidase (endoglycosidase H) (EC 3.2.1.96) has systematic name glycopeptide-D-mannosyl-N^{4}-(N-acetyl-D-glucosaminyl)2-asparagine 1,4-N-acetyl-β-glucosaminohydrolase. It is a highly specific endoglycosidase which cleaves asparagine-linked mannose rich oligosaccharides, but not highly processed complex oligosaccharides from glycoproteins. It is used for research purposes to deglycosylate glycoproteins and to monitor intracellular protein trafficking through the secretory pathway. In humans, Endo-beta-N-acetylglucosaminidase is encoded by the ENGASE gene.

== Structure and activity ==
Endoglycosidase H is isolated from Streptomyces plicatus or Streptomyces griseus. Its molecular mass is 29 kDa. The primary structure was described by Robbins et al. in 1984.

Endoglycosidase H cleaves the bond in the diacetylchitobiose core of the oligosaccharide between two N-acetylglucosamine (GlcNAc) subunits directly proximal to the asparagine residue, generating a truncated sugar molecule with one N-acetylglucosamine residue remaining on the asparagine.

It deglycosylates mannose glycoproteins, but the extent and rate of the deglycosylation depends to a high degree on the nature of the glycoproteins. The deglycosylation rate can be increased by denaturation of the glycoproteins (e.g., by carboxymethylation, sulfitolysis or by heating in the presence of sodium dodecyl sulfate). The addition of 0.1 M 2-mercaptoethanol highly increases enzyme activity against glycoproteins containing inter- or intra-molecular disulfide bridges, unlike detergents like Triton X-100, n- Octylglucoside, or zwitterionic detergents.

== Biochemical applications ==
Endoglycosidase H is commonly used by cell biologists to monitor posttranslational modification in the Golgi apparatus. Most proteins destined for the cell surface are translated by ribosomes into the rough endoplasmic reticulum (ER) and translocated into the Golgi. Upon entering the ER a molecule containing 14 sugar subunits is linked en bloc to an asparagine in a selective manner by the enzyme oligosaccharyl transferase. It is this oligosaccharide molecule which is modified by a series of enzymes as the protein moves through the different compartments of the Golgi apparatus. Endoglycosidase H is able to cleave each structure of this oligosaccharide as it is processed until the enzyme Golgi α-mannosidase II removes two mannose subunits. Since all later oligosaccharide structures are resistant to cleavage by endoglycosidase H the enzyme is widely used to report the extent of oligosaccharide processing a protein of interest has undergone.

== Close enzymes ==
- Endoglycosidases F and D, cleave Glc-Nac
- PNGase F (Peptide-N4-(N-acetyl-beta-glucosaminyl)asparagine_amidase)
