= SPAM1 =

Enzyme

Identifiers
- Aliases: SPAM1, HEL-S-96n, HYA1, HYAL1, HYAL3, HYAL5, PH-20, PH20, SPAG15, sperm adhesion molecule 1
- External IDs: OMIM: 600930; MGI: 1921718; GeneCards: SPAM1
Enzyme activity
EC #	BRENDA	ExPASy	KEGG	MetaCyc
3.2.1.35	↗	↗	↗	↗

Gene location (Human)
Chr.	Chromosome 7 (human)
Band	7q31.32	Start	123,925,237 bp
Band	7q31.32	End	123,971,414 bp

Gene location (Mouse)
Chr.	Chromosome 6 (mouse)
Band	6|6 A3.1	Start	24,857,996 bp
Band	6|6 A3.1	End	24,891,957 bp
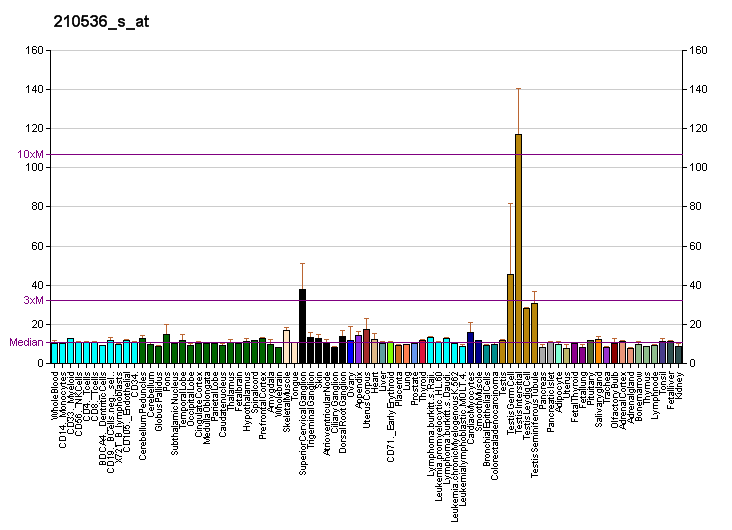
RNA expression pattern
Bgee	Human / Mouse (ortholog); Top expressed in: sperm; gonad; testicle; left testis; right testis; lower limb muscles; muscle of leg; gastrocnemius muscle; duodenum; placenta / Top expressed in: spermatid; epithelium of small intestine; seminiferous tubule; spermatocyte; migratory enteric neural crest cell; secondary oocyte; zygote; ileum; primary oocyte; sexually immature organism; More reference expression data
BioGPS	More reference expression data
Gene ontology
Molecular function	hyalurononglucosaminidase activity; catalytic activity; hydrolase activity; hydrolase activity, acting on glycosyl bonds
Cellular component	anchored component of membrane; plasma membrane; membrane
Biological process	fusion of sperm to egg plasma membrane involved in single fertilization; metabolism; cell adhesion; binding of sperm to zona pellucida; sperm-egg recognition; carbohydrate metabolic process
Sources:Amigo / QuickGO
Orthologs
Databases	NCBI: entry; OMA: entry
Species	Human	Mouse
Entrez	6677	74468
Ensembl	ENSG00000106304	ENSMUSG00000029678
UniProt	P38567	Q812F3
RefSeq (mRNA)	NM_001174044; NM_001174045; NM_001174046; NM_003117; NM_153189	NM_028957
RefSeq (protein)	NP_001167515; NP_001167516; NP_001167517; NP_003108; NP_694859	NP_083233
Location (UCSC)	Chr 7: 123.93 – 123.97 Mb	Chr 6: 24.86 – 24.89 Mb
PubMed search
- Wikidata
View/Edit Human	View/Edit Mouse

Hyaluronidase PH-20 is an enzyme that in humans is encoded by the SPAM1 gene.

Hyaluronidase degrades hyaluronic acid, a major structural proteoglycan found in extracellular matrices and basement membranes. Six members of the hyaluronidase family are clustered into two tightly linked groups on chromosome 3p21.3 and 7q31.3. This gene was previously referred to as HYAL1 and HYA1 and has since been assigned the official symbol SPAM1; another family member on chromosome 3p21.3 has been assigned HYAL1. This gene encodes a GPI-anchored enzyme located on the human sperm surface and inner acrosomal membrane. This multifunctional protein is a hyaluronidase that enables sperm to penetrate through the hyaluronic acid-rich cumulus cell layer surrounding the oocyte, a receptor that plays a role in hyaluronic acid induced cell signaling, and a receptor that is involved in sperm-zona pellucida adhesion. Abnormal expression of this gene in tumors has implicated this protein in degradation of basement membranes leading to tumor invasion and metastasis. Multiple protein isoforms are encoded by transcript variants of this gene.
