= Exoglycosidase =

Glycoside hydrolase enzyme

Exoglycosidases are glycoside hydrolase enzymes that cleave the glycosidic linkage of a terminal monosaccharide in an oligosaccharide or polysaccharide. Because each residue is removed separately, a series of exoglycosidases, each one cleaving at a specific glycolic linkage, is needed. These exoglycosidases can be used to remove a terminal sugar residue, to determine the sequence of a glycan, or for modifying glycans on glycoproteins.

== See also ==
- Endoglycosidase
