= Bovhyaluronidase azoximer =

Medication

Clinical data
- Pronunciation: Bovhyaluronidase azoximer (bovhyaluronidasum azoximerum)
- Trade names: Longidaze
- Routes of administration: intramuscular injection

Legal status
- Legal status: ЛС-000764

Pharmacokinetic data
- Bioavailability: not less than 90%
- Elimination half-life: 36 hours
- Excretion: renal

Bovhyaluronidase azoximer, sold under the brand name Longidaze, is a conjugate of proteolytic enzyme hyaluronidase with high- molecular weight copolymer that forms a component of combination therapy regimens for treatment and prevention of diseases associated with connective tissue hyperplasia. The most frequently observed adverse reactions seen with bovhyaluronidase azoximer include pain at site of injection and injection site reactions such as skin redness, itching and oedema. Local reactions typically resolve themselves in 48–72 hours.

== Clinical data ==
Type: Hyaluronidases

Other names: hyaluronidase conjugate with co-polymer of N-oxide 1,4-ethylenepiperazine and (N-carboxymethyl)-1,4- ethylenepiperazine bromide

Pharmaceutical form: suppositories

Pharmacotheapeutic group: enzymes

ATC Code: V03AX

== Medical uses ==
Bovhyaluronidase azoximer is a porous white or white with a yellowish or brownish tint mass and prepared in ampules 1500 IU or 3000 IE with mannitol excipient (up to 15 mg [for 1500 IE dos] or up to 20 mg (for 3000 IE dose).

The active ingredient belongs to the hyaluronidases family of enzymes that catalyse the degradation of hyaluronic acid. By catalyzing the hydrolysis of hyaluronan, a constituent of the body's extracellular matrix (ECM), hyaluronidase lowers the viscosity of hyaluronan, thereby increasing tissue permeability... It is, therefore, often used in medicine in conjunction with other drugs to speed their dispersion and delivery. It also increases the absorption rate of parenteral fluids given by hypodermoclysis, and is an adjunct in subcutaneous urography for improving resorption of radiopaque agents. Hyaluronidases are also used for extravasation of hyperosmolar solutions.

Approved applications include:

Gynaecology: treatment and prevention of adhesive process in lesser pelvis during inflammatory diseases of internal genital organs, including tubo-peritoneal infertility, intrauterine synechiae, chronic endometritis.

Urology: treatment of chronic prostatitis, interstitial cystitis.

Pulmonology and phthisiology: treatment of pneumosclerosis, fibrosing alveolitis, and tuberculosis (fibro-cavity, infiltrative, tuberculoma).

Orthopaedics: treatment of joint contracture, arthrosis, Marie-Striinipell disease, haematomas.

== History ==
Medicines incorporating hyaluronidase have been used in medical applications for over 60 years. The US Food and Drug Administration has approved hyaluronidase for the following indications: (1) subcutaneous fluid infusion (hypodermoclysis), (2) as an adjuvant to accelerate the absorption and dispersion of drugs in subcutaneous tissue or to manage extravasation, and (3) as an adjunct to promote the absorption of contrast media in urinary tract angiography (subcutaneous urography). They have also been approved and used for the purpose of increasing hematoma absorption in Europe. Hyaluronidase has a variety of uses in addition to its approved indications. Its current off-label uses include dissolving hyaluronic acid fillers, treating granulomatous foreign body reactions, and treating skin necrosis associated with filler injections.

Recognised limitations for hyaluronidase-based medicines include allergenic properties, presence of ballast impurities, loss of enzymatic activity due to temperature and inhibitors of blood serum. Since administration is via a parenteral route of administration, the enzyme is inactivated by blood serum inhibitors, which shortens its half-life.

Conjugation (covalent binding) of hyaluronidase with polymeric carriers prevents the unfolding of enzyme globule Hyal, increasing resistance to denaturation and the action of inhibitors while preserving the enzymes native structure and activity, thus prolonging its activity. The water-soluble copolymer 1,4-ethylene-piperazine N-oxide and (N-carboxymethyl)-1,4-ethylene-piperazinium bromide, itself an immunomodulator with anti-inflammatory properties, was found to confer increased stability. A comparative study of the stability of commercial hyaluronidase (Lydase®) and bovhyaluronidase azoximer showed a 20-fold increase in length of activity at 37 °C (24 hours vs. 20 days, respectively).

== Safety and tolerability ==
Frequently observed adverse events include (≥ 1/100 to < 1/10) – pain at injection site. Less frequent adverse events (≥ 1/1,000 to < 1/100) include injection site reaction such as skin redness, itching and oedema. All local reactions resolve themselves in 48 – 72 hours. Very rare (< 1/10000) – allergic reactions. Use of bovhyaluronidase azoximer is contraindicated in known cases of hypersensitivity to hyaluronidase, acute infectious diseases, pulmonary haemorrhage and haemoptysis, recent vitreous haemorrhage, malignant neoplasms, acute renal failure, age under 18 years (no clinical study data available). It should also be used with caution in cases of chronic liver failure (administer not more than once per week) and is contraindicated for use in pregnant and breast-feeding women.

== Concomitant medications ==
Bovhyaluronidase azoximer can be prescribed with other medications such as antifungal drugs, bronchial spasmolytics, antibiotics and antivirals. When administered in combination with other medicinal product (antibiotics, local anesthetics, diuretics) bovhyaluronidase azoximer increases their bioavailability and enhances their effect. In case of co-administration with high doses of salicylates, cortisone, adrenocorticotrophic hormone (ACTH), estrogens or antihistaminic drugs bovhyaluronidase azoximer enzymatic activity can decrease. It is advised that bovhyaluronidase azoximer is not administered with medicinal products containing furosemide, benzodiazepines, phenytoin.
