= Trastuzumab/hyaluronidase =

Pharmaceutical drug

Combination of
- Trastuzumab: HER2/neu receptor antagonist
- Hyaluronidase: Endoglycosidase

Clinical data
- Trade names: Herceptin SC, Herceptin Hylecta
- AHFS/Drugs.com: Micromedex Detailed Consumer Information
- MedlinePlus: a619041
- Routes of administration: Subcutaneous injection
- ATC code: None

Legal status
- Legal status: AU: S4 (Prescription only); CA: ℞-only; US: ℞-only; EU: Rx-only; In general: ℞ (Prescription only)

Identifiers
- CAS Number: 180288-69-1; 757971-58-7
- UNII: P188ANX8CK; 743QUY4VD8
- KEGG: D11560

Trastuzumab/hyaluronidase, sold under the brand name Herceptin SC among others, is a fixed-dose combination medication for the treatment of HER2-overexpressing breast cancer in adults. It is a combination of trastuzumab and hyaluronidase.

The most common adverse reactions include fatigue, arthralgia, diarrhea, injection site reaction, upper respiratory tract infection, rash, myalgia, nausea, headache, edema, flushing, pyrexia, cough, and pain in extremity.

Trastuzumab/hyaluronidase was approved for medical use in the European Union in August 2013. Trastuzumab/hyaluronidase was approved for medical use in the United States in February 2019.

== Medical uses ==
Trastuzumab/hyaluronidase is indicated for adjuvant treatment of adults with HER2 overexpressing node positive or node negative (ER/PR negative or with one high risk feature; and it is indicated in combination with paclitaxel for first-line treatment of HER2-overexpressing metastatic breast cancer.

== History ==
Trastuzumab/hyaluronidase (Herceptin SC) was approved for medical use in the European Union in August 2013.

Trastuzumab/hyaluronidase (Herceptin Hylecta) was approved for medical use in the United States in February 2019.

Approval of trastuzumab/hyaluronidase was based on two randomized trials, HannaH (NCT00950300) and SafeHER (NCT01566721). In HannaH, 596 participants with HER2-positive operable or locally advanced breast cancer, including inflammatory breast cancer, were randomized to receive 8 cycles of either trastuzumab/hyaluronidase or intravenous trastuzumab concurrently with chemotherapy, followed by surgery and continued therapy with either trastuzumab/hyaluronidase or intravenous trastuzumab, for an additional 10 cycles. HannaH demonstrated comparability between trastuzumab/hyaluronidase and intravenous trastuzumab based on co-primary endpoints of pathologic complete response and pharmacokinetics. Pathological complete response (pCR) was observed in 118 participants (45.4%) on the trastuzumab/hyaluronidase arm and in 107 participants (40.7%) receiving intravenous trastuzumab (95% CI for difference in pCR: -4.0; 13.4).

SafeHER was a prospective, two-cohort, non-randomized, multinational, open-label trial assessing the overall safety and tolerability of trastuzumab/hyaluronidase with chemotherapy in 1,864 participants with HER2-positive breast cancer. Participants received a fixed dose of 600 mg trastuzumab/hyaluronidase every 3 weeks for 18 cycles. trastuzumab/hyaluronidase was initiated either sequentially with chemotherapy, concurrently with chemotherapy, or without adjuvant chemotherapy, or in combination with neoadjuvant chemotherapy followed by trastuzumab.
