= Hyaluronoglucuronidase =

Class of enzymes

Identifiers
- EC no.: 3.2.1.36
- CAS no.: 37288-34-9

Databases
- IntEnz: IntEnz view
- BRENDA: BRENDA entry
- ExPASy: NiceZyme view
- KEGG: KEGG entry
- MetaCyc: metabolic pathway
- PRIAM: profile
- PDB structures: RCSB PDB PDBe PDBsum
Search
- PMC: articles
- PubMed: articles
- NCBI: proteins

Hyaluronoglucuronidase (EC 3.2.1.36, hyaluronidase, glucuronoglucosaminoglycan hyaluronate lyase, orgelase) is an enzyme with systematic name hyaluronate 3-glycanohydrolase. This enzyme catalyses the following chemical reaction

Random hydrolysis of (1→3)-linkages between β-D-glucuronate and N-acetyl-D-glucosamine residues in hyaluronate
