= Halocarban =

Chemical compound

Identifiers
- IUPAC name: 1-(4-Chlorophenyl)-3-[4-chloro-3-(trifluoromethyl)phenyl]urea
- CAS Number: 369-77-7
- PubChem CID: 9719
- ChemSpider: 9337
- UNII: I5ZZY3DC5G
- KEGG: D03548
- ChEBI: CHEBI:135477
- ChEMBL: ChEMBL1981438
- CompTox Dashboard (EPA): DTXSID0048684
- ECHA InfoCard: 100.006.113

Chemical and physical data
- Formula: C_{14}H_{9}Cl_{2}F_{3}N_{2}O
- Molar mass: 349.13 g·mol^{−1}
- 3D model (JSmol): Interactive image
- SMILES: C1=CC(=CC=C1NC(=O)NC2=CC(=C(C=C2)Cl)C(F)(F)F)Cl
- InChI: InChI=1S/C14H9Cl2F3N2O/c15-8-1-3-9(4-2-8)20-13(22)21-10-5-6-12(16)11(7-10)14(17,18)19/h1-7H,(H2,20,21,22); Key:ZFSXZJXLKAJIGS-UHFFFAOYSA-N

Halocarban (INN; also known as cloflucarban (USAN) and trifluoromethyldichlorocarbanilide; brand name Irgasan CF3) is a chemical with antibacterial properties sometimes used in deodorant and soap.
