= Halocortolone =

Chemical compound

Clinical data
- Other names: 9α-Chloro-6α,11β-difluoro-21-hydroxy-16α-methylpregna-1,4-diene-3,20-dione
- Drug class: Corticosteroid; Glucocorticoid

Identifiers
- IUPAC name: (6S,8S,9R,10S,11S,13S,14S,16R,17S)-9-Chloro-6,11-difluoro-17-(2-hydroxyacetyl)-10,13,16-trimethyl-7,8,11,12,14,15,16,17-octahydro-6H-cyclopenta[a]phenanthren-3-one
- CAS Number: 24320-27-2
- PubChem CID: 20056980
- ChemSpider: 16736630
- UNII: Z9TL048W82
- ChEMBL: ChEMBL2106353
- CompTox Dashboard (EPA): DTXSID601043241

Chemical and physical data
- Formula: C_{22}H_{27}ClF_{2}O_{3}
- Molar mass: 412.90 g·mol^{−1}
- 3D model (JSmol): Interactive image
- SMILES: C[C@@H]1C[C@H]2[C@@H]3C[C@@H](C4=CC(=O)C=C[C@@]4([C@]3([C@H](C[C@@]2([C@H]1C(=O)CO)C)F)Cl)C)F
- InChI: InChI=1S/C22H27ClF2O3/c1-11-6-13-14-8-16(24)15-7-12(27)4-5-21(15,3)22(14,23)18(25)9-20(13,2)19(11)17(28)10-26/h4-5,7,11,13-14,16,18-19,26H,6,8-10H2,1-3H3/t11-,13+,14+,16+,18+,19-,20+,21+,22+/m1/s1; Key:MBRXSOUHUFBPQC-RFPWEZLHSA-N

Halocortolone is a synthetic glucocorticoid corticosteroid which was never marketed.
