= Lazertinib =

Anti-cancer medication

Clinical data
- Trade names: Leclaza, Lazcluze, others
- AHFS/Drugs.com: Monograph
- MedlinePlus: a624058
- License data: US DailyMed: Lazertinib
- Routes of administration: By mouth
- Drug class: EGFR inhibitor
- ATC code: L01EB09 (WHO)

Legal status
- Legal status: CA: ℞-only; US: ℞-only; EU: Rx-only; In general: ℞ (Prescription only)

Identifiers
- IUPAC name: N-[5-[[4-[4-[(dimethylamino)methyl]-3-phenylpyrazol-1-yl]pyrimidin-2-yl]amino]-4-methoxy-2-morpholin-4-ylphenyl]prop-2-enamide
- CAS Number: 1903008-80-9
- PubChem CID: 121269225
- IUPHAR/BPS: 10136
- DrugBank: DB16216
- ChemSpider: 64835231
- UNII: 4A2Y23XK11
- KEGG: D11980; D12245
- ChEMBL: ChEMBL4558324

Chemical and physical data
- Formula: C_{30}H_{34}N_{8}O_{3}
- Molar mass: 554.655 g·mol^{−1}
- 3D model (JSmol): Interactive image
- SMILES: CN(C)CC1=CN(N=C1C2=CC=CC=C2)C3=NC(=NC=C3)NC4=C(C=C(C(=C4)NC(=O)C=C)N5CCOCC5)OC
- InChI: InChI=1S/C30H34N8O3/c1-5-28(39)32-23-17-24(26(40-4)18-25(23)37-13-15-41-16-14-37)33-30-31-12-11-27(34-30)38-20-22(19-36(2)3)29(35-38)21-9-7-6-8-10-21/h5-12,17-18,20H,1,13-16,19H2,2-4H3,(H,32,39)(H,31,33,34); Key:RRMJMHOQSALEJJ-UHFFFAOYSA-N

Lazertinib, sold under the brand names Lazcluze and Leclaza among others, is an anti-cancer medication used for the treatment of non-small cell lung cancer. It is a kinase inhibitor of epidermal growth factor receptor.

The most common adverse reactions include rash, nail toxicity, infusion-related reactions (amivantamab), musculoskeletal pain, edema, stomatitis, venous thromboembolism, paresthesia, fatigue, diarrhea, constipation, COVID-19 infection, hemorrhage, dry skin, decreased appetite, pruritus, nausea, and ocular toxicity.

Lazertinib was approved for medical use in South Korea in January 2021, in the United States in August 2024, and in the European Union in January 2025.

== Medical uses ==
Lazertinib is indicated, in combination with amivantamab, for the first-line treatment of adults with locally advanced or metastatic non-small cell lung cancer with epidermal growth factor receptor exon 19 deletions or exon 21 L858R substitution mutations.

== History ==
Efficacy was evaluated in MARIPOSA (NCT04487080), a randomized, active-controlled, multi-center trial of 1074 participants with exon 19 deletion or exon 21 L858R substitution mutation-positive locally advanced or metastatic non-small cell lung cancer and no prior systemic therapy for advanced disease. Participants were randomized (2:2:1) to receive lazertinib in combination with amivantamab, osimertinib monotherapy, or lazertinib monotherapy (an unapproved regimen for non-small cell lung cancer) until disease progression or unacceptable toxicity. The US Food and Drug Administration (FDA) approved lazertinib in combination with amivantamab based on evidence from one clinical trial (MARIPOSA, NCT04487080) using data from 858 adult participants with locally advanced or metastatic non-small cell lung cancer with EGFR exon 19 deletions or exon 21 L858R substitution mutations. The trial was conducted at 204 sites in 26 countries including China, South Korea, Brazil, Japan, Malaysia, Spain, Taiwan, Russian Federation, Turkey, Thailand, Mexico, France, Italy, Ukraine, Argentina, Poland, the United States, India, Australia, Portugal, Israel, the United Kingdom, Germany, Belgium, Hungary, and Netherlands. Of the 858 participants, 12 were enrolled at sites in the United States. Among the 858 participants, all were evaluated for efficacy and 849 were evaluated for safety.

== Society and culture ==
=== Legal status ===
Lazertinib was approved for medical use in the United States in August 2024.

In November 2024, the Committee for Medicinal Products for Human Use of the European Medicines Agency adopted a positive opinion, recommending the granting of a marketing authorization for the medicinal product Lazcluze, intended in combination with amivantamab, for the treatment of non-small cell lung cancer (NSCLC) with activating epidermal growth factor receptor (EGFR) exon 19 deletions or exon 21 L858R substitution mutations. The applicant for this medicinal product is Janssen-Cilag International NV. Lazertinib was authorized for medical use in the European Union in January 2025.

=== Names ===
Lazertinib is the international nonproprietary name.

Lazertinib is sold under the brand name Lazcluze and in South Korea as Leclaza.
