= HYAL3 =

Protein-coding gene in the species Homo sapiens

Identifiers
- Aliases: HYAL3, HYAL-3, LUCA-3, LUCA3, hyaluronoglucosaminidase 3, hyaluronidase 3
- External IDs: OMIM: 604038; MGI: 1330288; GeneCards: HYAL3
Enzyme activity
| EC # | BRENDA | ExPASy | KEGG | MetaCyc |
|---|---|---|---|---|
| 3.2.1.35 | ↗ | ↗ | ↗ | ↗ |

Gene location (Human)
| Chr. | Chromosome 3 (human) |
| Band | 3p21.31 | Start | 50,292,831 bp |
| Band | 3p21.31 | End | 50,299,405 bp |

Gene location (Mouse)
| Chr. | Chromosome 9 (mouse) |
| Band | 9 F1|9 58.19 cM | Start | 107,458,017 bp |
| Band | 9 F1|9 58.19 cM | End | 107,464,558 bp |
RNA expression pattern
| Bgee | Human / Mouse (ortholog); Top expressed in: testicle; gonad; bone marrow; prefrontal cortex; left testis; right hemisphere of cerebellum; right testis; superior frontal gyrus; primary visual cortex; right frontal lobe / Top expressed in: embryo; embryo; right kidney; blastocyst; proximal tubule; spermatid; zygote; vestibular membrane of cochlear duct; ventricular zone; tail of embryo; More reference expression data |
| BioGPS | n/a |
Gene ontology
| Molecular function | hydrolase activity, acting on glycosyl bonds; protein binding; hyaluronoglucuronidase activity; hydrolase activity; catalytic activity; hyalurononglucosaminidase activity |
| Cellular component | extracellular region; acrosomal vesicle; acrosomal membrane; lysosome; endosome; early endosome; endoplasmic reticulum; plasma membrane; membrane; cytoplasmic vesicle; sperm midpiece |
| Biological process | cellular response to UV-B; cartilage development; response to antibiotic; cellular response to tumor necrosis factor; metabolism; cellular response to interleukin-1; inflammatory response; hyaluronan catabolic process; carbohydrate metabolic process; response to virus; ovarian follicle atresia; single fertilization; penetration of zona pellucida; negative regulation of ovarian follicle development; positive regulation of acrosomal vesicle exocytosis; viral entry into host cell |
Sources:Amigo / QuickGO
Orthologs
| Databases | NCBI: entry; OMA: entry |
| Species | Human | Mouse |
| Entrez | 8372 | 109685 |
| Ensembl | ENSG00000186792 | ENSMUSG00000036091 |
| UniProt | O43820 | Q8VEI3 |
| RefSeq (mRNA) | NM_003549; NM_001200029; NM_001200030; NM_001200031; NM_001200032 | NM_178020 |
| RefSeq (protein) | NP_001186958; NP_001186959; NP_001186960; NP_001186961; NP_003540 | NP_821139 |
| Location (UCSC) | Chr 3: 50.29 – 50.3 Mb | Chr 9: 107.46 – 107.46 Mb |
| PubMed search |
- Wikidata
| View/Edit Human | View/Edit Mouse |

Hyaluronidase-3 is an enzyme that in humans is encoded by the HYAL3 gene.

This gene encodes a protein which is similar in structure to hyaluronidases. Hyaluronidases intracellularly degrade hyaluronan, one of the major glycosaminoglycans of the extracellular matrix. Hyaluronan is thought to be involved in cell proliferation, migration and differentiation. However, this protein has not yet been shown to have hyaluronidase activity. The gene is one of several related genes in a region of chromosome 3p21.3 associated with tumor suppression.
