= Amivantamab =

Monoclonal antibody

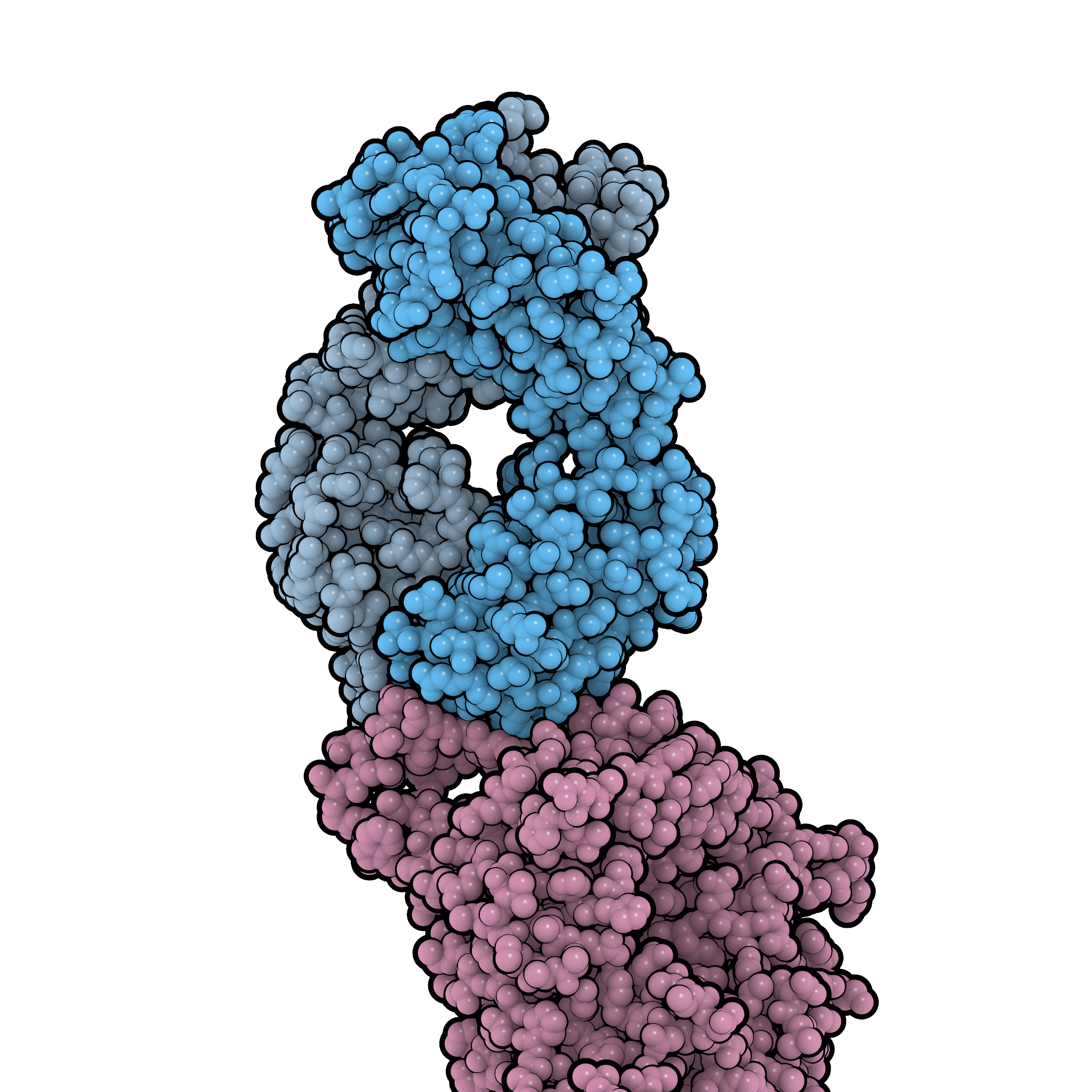
- Space-filling model of the anti-MET arm of amivantamab (blue) bound to the Sema domain of human MET (puce). PDB: 6wvz

Monoclonal antibody
- Type: Whole antibody
- Source: Human
- Target: Epidermal growth factor receptor (EGFR) and MET

Clinical data
- Trade names: Rybrevant
- Other names: JNJ-61186372, amivantamab-vmjw
- AHFS/Drugs.com: Monograph
- MedlinePlus: a621034
- License data: US DailyMed: Amivantamab
- Pregnancy category: AU: D
- Routes of administration: Intravenous infusion
- Drug class: Antineoplastic
- ATC code: L01FX18 (WHO)

Legal status
- Legal status: AU: S4 (Prescription only); CA: ℞-only / Schedule D; US: ℞-only; EU: Rx-only

Identifiers
- CAS Number: 2171511-58-1
- DrugBank: DB16695
- UNII: 0JSR7Z0NB6
- KEGG: D11894

Chemical and physical data
- Formula: C_{6472}H_{10014}N_{1730}O_{2023}S_{46}
- Molar mass: 145902.15 g·mol^{−1}

Amivantamab, sold under the brand name Rybrevant, is a bispecific monoclonal antibody used to treat non-small cell lung cancer. Amivantamab is a bispecific epidermal growth factor (EGF) receptor-directed and MET receptor-directed antibody. It is the first treatment for adults with non-small cell lung cancer whose tumors have specific types of genetic mutations: epidermal growth factor receptor (EGFR) exon 20 insertion mutations.

The most common side effects include rash, infusion-related reactions, skin infections around the fingernails or toenails, muscle and joint pain, shortness of breath, nausea, fatigue, swelling in the lower legs or hands or face, sores in the mouth, cough, constipation, vomiting and changes in certain blood tests.

Amivantamab was approved for medical use in the United States in May 2021, and in the European Union in December 2021. The US Food and Drug Administration considers it to be a first-in-class medication.

== Medical uses ==
Amivantamab is indicated for the treatment of adults with locally advanced or metastatic non-small cell lung cancer with epidermal growth factor receptor (EGFR) exon 20 insertion mutations, as detected by an FDA-approved test, whose disease has progressed on or after platinum-based chemotherapy.

In March 2024, the FDA approved amivantamab, in combination with carboplatin and pemetrexed, for the first-line treatment of locally advanced or metastatic non-small cell lung cancer with epidermal growth factor receptor (EGFR) exon 20 insertion mutations, as detected by an FDA-approved test. The FDA also granted traditional approval to amivantamab for adults with locally advanced or metastatic non-small cell lung cancer with epidermal growth factor receptor exon 20 insertion mutations, as detected by an FDA-approved test, whose disease has progressed on or after platinum-based chemotherapy. The FDA previously granted accelerated approval for this indication. The expanded indication for amivantamab was approved in the European Union in July 2024.

In August 2024, the FDA approved lazertinib, in combination with amivantamab, for the treatment of non-small lung cancer.

In September 2024, the FDA approved amivantamab-vmjw with carboplatin and pemetrexed for adults with locally advanced or metastatic non-small-cell lung cancer (NSCLC) with epidermal growth factor receptor (EGFR) exon 19 deletions or exon 21 L858R substitution mutations whose disease has progressed on or after treatment with an EGFR tyrosine kinase inhibitor.

== Side effects ==
The most common side effects include rash, infusion-related reactions, infected skin around the nail, muscle and joint pain, shortness of breath, nausea, feeling very tired, swelling of hands, ankles, feet, face, or all of your body, sores in the mouth, cough, constipation, vomiting, and changes in certain blood tests (for example, decreased albumin levels, increased glucose levels, increased liver enzymes).

Amivantamab may cause serious side effects including infusion-related reactions, lung inflammation, skin problems, eye problems, and harm to an unborn baby.

== History ==
The US Food and Drug Administration (FDA) approved amivantamab based on CHRYSALIS, a multicenter, non-randomized, open label, multicohort clinical trial (NCT02609776) which included participants with locally advanced or metastatic non-small cell lung cancer (NSCLC) with EGFR exon 20 insertion mutations. Efficacy was evaluated in 81 participants with advanced NSCLC with EGFR exon 20 insertion mutations whose disease had progressed on or after platinum-based chemotherapy. In the published study, the overall response rate was 40%, with a median duration of response of 11.1 months, and a median progression-free survival of 8.3 months (95% CI, 6.5 to 10.9). The trial was conducted at 53 sites in the United States, South Korea, Taiwan, Japan, Great Britain, France, Spain, Canada, China, and Australia.

The FDA collaborated on the review of amivantamab with the Brazilian Health Regulatory Agency (ANVISA) and the United Kingdom's Medicines and Healthcare products Regulatory Agency (MHRA). The application reviews are ongoing at the other regulatory agencies.

In March 2024, the FDA approved amivantamab, in combination with carboplatin and pemetrexed, for the first-line treatment of locally advanced or metastatic non-small cell lung cancer with epidermal growth factor receptor (EGFR) exon 20 insertion mutations, as detected by an FDA-approved test. The FDA also granted traditional approval to amivantamab for adults with locally advanced or metastatic non-small cell lung cancer with epidermal growth factor receptor exon 20 insertion mutations, as detected by an FDA-approved test, whose disease has progressed on or after platinum-based chemotherapy. The FDA previously granted accelerated approval for this indication. Efficacy was evaluated in PAPILLON (NCT04538664), a randomized, open-label multicenter trial of 308 participants with epidermal growth factor receptor (EGFR) exon 20 insertion mutations. Participants were randomized 1:1 to receive amivantamab with carboplatin and pemetrexed or carboplatin and pemetrexed.

In August 2024, the FDA approved amivantamab in combination with lazertinib for the first-line treatment of patients with locally advanced or metastatic non-small cell lung cancer with EGFR exon 19 deletions or L858R substitutions. This approval was based on the MARIPOSA study that evaluated the efficacy of amivantamab in combination with lazertinib compared with single-agent osimertinib. The combination treatment led to longer progression-free and overall survival compared with the control arm.

== Society and culture ==
=== Legal status ===
Amivantamab was approved for medical use in the United States in May 2021.

In October 2021, the Committee for Medicinal Products for Human Use (CHMP) of the European Medicines Agency (EMA) adopted a positive opinion, recommending the granting of a conditional marketing authorization for the medicinal product Rybrevant, intended for the treatment of non-small cell lung cancer (NSCLC) with activating epidermal growth factor receptor (EGFR) exon 20 insertion mutations. The applicant for this medicinal product was Janssen-Cilag International N.V. Amivantamab was approved for medical use in the European Union in December 2021. The conditional marketing authorization was converted to a standard marketing authorization in July 2024.

=== Names ===
Amivantamab is the international nonproprietary name (INN).

== Research ==
Amivantamab is being investigated in combination with lazertinib versus osimertinib; and in combination with carboplatin-pemetrexed chemotherapy compared to carboplatin-pemetrexed.
