= HBI-3000 =

Experimental drug candidate

Names
- Preferred IUPAC name N-({4-Hydroxy-3,5-bis[(pyrrolidin-1-yl)methyl]phenyl}methyl)-4-methoxybenzene-1-sulfonamide

Identifiers
CAS Number	343935-60-4; 343935-61-5 (sulfate)
3D model (JSmol)	Interactive image
ChemSpider	8318784
PubChem CID	10143275
UNII	4Q5HLV8HG1; 4NDN0NJZ62 (sulfate)
CompTox Dashboard (EPA)	DTXSID501030148
- InChI: InChI=1S/C24H33N3O4S/c1-31-22-6-8-23(9-7-22)32(29,30)25-16-19-14-20(17-26-10-2-3-11-26)24(28)21(15-19)18-27-12-4-5-13-27/h6-9,14-15,25,28H,2-5,10-13,16-18H2,1H3 Key: SYZGIWXQGIBJGN-UHFFFAOYSA-N; InChI=1/C24H33N3O4S/c1-31-22-6-8-23(9-7-22)32(29,30)25-16-19-14-20(17-26-10-2-3-11-26)24(28)21(15-19)18-27-12-4-5-13-27/h6-9,14-15,25,28H,2-5,10-13,16-18H2,1H3 Key: SYZGIWXQGIBJGN-UHFFFAOYAK
- SMILES: O=S(=O)(c1ccc(OC)cc1)NCc2cc(c(O)c(c2)CN3CCCC3)CN4CCCC4

Properties
Chemical formula	C_{24}H_{33}N_{3}O_{4}S
Molar mass	459.61 g·mol^{−1}
- Except where otherwise noted, data are given for materials in their standard state (at 25 °C [77 °F], 100 kPa). Infobox references

HBI-3000 (sulcardine sulfate) is an experimental drug candidate that is currently in phase II of human clinical trials as an antiarrhythmic agent. Clinical investigation will test the safety and efficacy of HBI-3000 as a treatment for both atrial and ventricular arrhythmias.

== The molecular problem ==
Anti-arrhythmic medication is taken to treat irregular beating of the heart. This irregular beating results from a deregulation of the initiation or propagation of the electrical stimulus of the heart. The most common chronic arrhythmia is atrial fibrillation. There is an increased incidence of atrial fibrillation in the elderly and some examples of complications include heart failure exacerbation, hypotension, and thromboembolic events.

Most anti-arrhythmic medications exert their effects by decreasing the permeability of potassium ion channels (IKr) in heart cells. These potassium channel blockers delay ventricular repolarization and prolong action potential duration (APD; the prolongation of the electrical stimulus within heart cells). These changes can lower heart rate, eliminate atrial fibrillation, and ultimately sudden cardiac death.

== Mechanism of action in ventricular myocytes ==
Ventricular myocytes are heart muscle cells found in the lower chambers of the heart. Heart rate is dependent on the movement of an electrical stimulus through the individual heart cells. This is mediated by the opening of ion channels on cell surfaces. HBI-3000 exerts its effects on the heart by inhibiting multiple ion channels (INa-F, INa-L, ICa-L and IKr), but predominantly the INa-L ion channel. By decreasing the ion permeability of these channels, HBI-3000 slightly prolongs APD (due to IKr); however, unlike pure IKr channel blockers, it is self-limited (due to the decreased permeability of INa-L and ICa-L). This is similar to the medications ranolazine and amiodarone. HBI-3000 suppresses early afterdepolarizations (EADs; a change in the normal net flow of ions during repolarization), does not produce any electrical abnormalities, and displays minimally pronounced prolongation of APD during a slow heart rate (i.e. stimulated at a slower frequency). Pronounced prolongation of APD during a slow heart rate can lead to proarrythmias. Overall, HBI-3000 seems to have a low proarrhythmic risk. The effect of HBI-3000 on contractility and cardiac conduction requires further investigation.

== Studies ==
=== Animal model ===
In a canine model, the intravenous injection of HBI-3000 demonstrated to be an effective anti-arrhythmic and anti-fribrillatory agent.

=== Cellular isolation ===
The administration of HBI-3000 to isolated heart muscle cells demonstrated the potential to improve arrhythmias while having low proarrhythmic risk.

=== Human studies ===
Jiangsu Furui Pharmaceuticals Co., Ltd is currently recruiting participants in their study.

== See also ==
- Myocytes
- Ion channels
