= Halopredone =

Chemical compound

Clinical data
- Other names: 2-Bromo-6β,9α-difluoro-11β,17α,21-trihydroxypregna-1,4-diene-3,20-dione
- Drug class: Corticosteroid; Glucocorticoid

Identifiers
- IUPAC name: (6R,8S,9R,10S,11S,13S,14S,17R)-2-Bromo-6,9-difluoro-11,17-dihydroxy-17-(2-hydroxyacetyl)-10,13-dimethyl-6,7,8,11,12,14,15,16-octahydrocyclopenta[a]phenanthren-3-one
- CAS Number: 57781-15-4
- PubChem CID: 12788355
- ChemSpider: 19973602
- UNII: 6F4361R42W
- KEGG: D08036
- ChEMBL: ChEMBL3250144
- CompTox Dashboard (EPA): DTXSID901024141
- ECHA InfoCard: 100.055.394

Chemical and physical data
- Formula: C_{21}H_{25}BrF_{2}O_{5}
- Molar mass: 475.327 g·mol^{−1}
- 3D model (JSmol): Interactive image
- SMILES: C[C@]12C[C@@H]([C@]3([C@H]([C@@H]1CC[C@@]2(C(=O)CO)O)C[C@H](C4=CC(=O)C(=C[C@@]43C)Br)F)F)O
- InChI: InChI=1S/C21H25BrF2O5/c1-18-8-16(27)21(24)11(10(18)3-4-20(18,29)17(28)9-25)5-14(23)12-6-15(26)13(22)7-19(12,21)2/h6-7,10-11,14,16,25,27,29H,3-5,8-9H2,1-2H3/t10-,11-,14+,16-,18-,19-,20-,21-/m0/s1; Key:MYZDPUZXMFCPMU-LRIWMWCYSA-N

Halopredone is a synthetic glucocorticoid corticosteroid which was never marketed.
