= Endoglycosidase =

An Endoglycosidase is an enzyme that releases oligosaccharides from glycoproteins or glycolipids. It may also cleave polysaccharide chains between residues that are not the terminal residue, although releasing oligosaccharides from conjugated protein and lipid molecules is more common.

It breaks the glycosidic bonds between two sugar monomer in the polymer. It is different from exoglycosidase that it does not do so at the terminal residue. Hence, it is used to release long carbohydrates from conjugated molecules. If an exoglycosidase were used, every monomer in the polymer would have to be removed, one by one from the chain, taking a long time. An endoglycosidase cleaves, giving a polymeric product.

PROTEIN-x_{1}-x_{2}-x_{3}-x_{4}-x_{5}-x_{6}-x_{7}-x_{8}-x_{9}-x_{10}-x_{11}-...-x_{n}

== Mechanism Overview ==
Examples of various endoglycosidases
| Endoglycosidase | Glycoside | Bond hydrolysed |
|---|---|---|
| D | | |
| F | Glc-Nac | Glc // Nac |
| F1 | | |
| F2 | Glc-Nac | Glc // Nac |
| H | diacetylchitobiose | Nac // asparagine |
Nac: N-Acetylglucosamine

The mechanism is an enzymatic hydrolysis that requires two critical molecules; a proton donor (most likely an acid) and a nucleophile(most likely a base). The Endoglycosidases mechanism has two forms; an acid catalyzed protonation of the glycosidic oxygen yielding stereochemical retention at the anomeric carbon or an acid catalyzed protonation of the glycosidic oxygen with a concomitant attack of a water molecule activated by the base residue yielding a stereochemical inversion.

Both mechanisms exhibit the same distance between the proton donor and the glycosidic oxygen, situating the proton donor close enough to the glycosidic oxygen for hydrogen bonding. It is the distance between the nucleophile and the anomeric carbon where the two mechanisms begin to diverge. Because the inversion mechanism must accommodate enough space for the water molecule, the nucleophile is situated further away from the anomeric carbon. In the retention mechanism, this distance is only 5.5 -7 angstroms but increases to 9-10 angstroms in the inversion mechanism. Furthermore, the inversion mechanism was found to proceed through a single displacement mechanism involving an oxocarbenium ion-like transition state. Due to the retention mechanism's proximity between the two carboxyl groups, it goes through a double displacement mechanism that produces a covalent glycosyl-enzyme intermediate.

An exoglycosidase would remove each carbohydrate monomer (x) one by one from the end, starting at x_{n}, whereas and endoglycosidase can cut at any glycosidic bond (-) and may cleave after a signature 'link oligosaccharide' that links certain carbohydrates to certain proteins.

== Applications and potential uses ==
There has been great potential shown in the use of endoglycosidase enzymes undergoing mutagenesis. This new mutated enzyme when exposed to the proper compounds will undergo oligosaccharide synthesis and will not hydrolyze the newly formed polymer chains. This is an extremely useful tool, as oligosaccharides have a great potential for use as therapeutics. For example, globo H hexasaccharide will indicate cancer related malignant cell transformation in the breast, prostate and ovaries.

Endoglycosidases also have potential application in fighting autoimmune diseases such as arthritis and systemic lupus erythematosus. In 2008, a team of researchers demonstrated that injection of endoglycosidase S “efficiently removes the IgG-associated sugar domain in vivo and interferes with autoantibody-mediated proinflammatory processes in a variety of autoimmune models.” Clearly the manipulation and mutation of this enzyme holds great promise for being able to fight a variety of diseases in the body.

== See also ==
- Exoglycosidase
- N-linked glycosylation
- O-linked glycosylation
