= International Classification of Diseases for Oncology =

Diagnosis classification

The International Classification of Diseases for Oncology (ICD-O) is a domain-specific extension of the International Statistical Classification of Diseases and Related Health Problems for tumor diseases. This classification is widely used by cancer registries.

It is currently in its third revision (ICD-O-3). ICD-10 includes a list of morphology codes. They stem from ICD-O second edition (ICD-O-2) that was valid at the time of publication.

== Axes ==
The classification has two axes: topography and morphology.

=== Morphology ===
The morphology axis addresses the microscopic structure (histology) of the tumor.

This axis has particular importance because the Systematized Nomenclature of Medicine ("SNOMED") has adopted the ICD-O classification of morphology. SNOMED has been changing continuously, and several different versions of SNOMED are in use. Accordingly, mapping of ICD-O codes to SNOMED requires careful assessment of whether entities are indeed true matches.

=== Topography ===
The topography axis addresses the tumor's site in the body. It is standardized with the C section of ICD-10.

There were no changes in the topography axis between ICD-O-2 and ICD-O-3.

See List of ICD-10 codes#(C00–C97) Malignant Neoplasms for examples.

== International Classification of Diseases for Oncology, Third Edition (ICD-O-3) ==
=== 5th Digit Behaviour Code for Neoplasms ===
- /0 Benign
- /1 Uncertain whether benign or malignant
  - Borderline malignancy
  - Low malignant potential
  - Uncertain malignant potential
- /2 Carcinoma in situ
  - Intraepithelial
  - Noninfiltrating
  - Noninvasive
- /3 Malignant, primary site
- /6 Malignant, metastatic site
  - Malignant, secondary site
- /9 Malignant, uncertain whether primary or metastatic site

== Morphology Codes (ICD-O-3) ==
=== 800 Neoplasms, NOS ===
M8000/0 Neoplasm, benign

- Tumor, benign
- Unclassified tumor, benign

M8000/1 Neoplasm, uncertain whether benign or malignant

- Neoplasm, NOS
- Tumor, NOS
- Unclassified tumor, uncertain whether benign or malignant
- Unclassified tumor, borderline malignancy

M8000/3 Neoplasm, malignant

- Tumor, malignant, NOS
- Malignancy
- Cancer
- Unclassified tumor, malignant
- Blastoma, NOS

M8000/6 Neoplasm, metastatic

- Neoplasm, metastatic
- Tumor, metastatic
- Tumor, secondary
- Tumor embolus

M8000/9 Neoplasm, malignant, uncertain whether primary or metastatic

- Unclassified tumor, malignant, uncertain whether primary or metastatic

M8001/0 Tumor cells, benign

M8001/1 Tumor cells, uncertain whether benign or malignant

- Tumor cells, NOS

M8001/3 Tumor cells, malignant

M8002/3 Malignant tumor, small cell type

M8003/3 Malignant tumor, giant cell type

M8004/3 Malignant tumor, spindle cell type

- Malignant tumor, fusiform cell type

M8005/0 Clear cell tumor, NOS

M8005/3 Malignant tumor, clear cell type

=== 801–804 Epithelial Neoplasms, NOS ===
- M8010/0 Epithelial tumor, benign
- M8010/2 Carcinoma in situ, NOS
  - Intraepithelial carcinoma, NOS
- M8010/3 Carcinoma, NOS
  - Epithelial tumor, malignant
- M8010/6 Carcinoma, metastatic, NOS
  - Secondary carcinoma
- M8010/9 Carcinomatosis
- M8011/0 Epithelioma, benign
- M8011/3 Epithelioma, malignant
  - Epithelioma, NOS
- M8012/3 Large cell carcinoma, NOS
- M8013/3 Large cell neuroendocrine carcinoma
- M8014/3 Large cell carcinoma with rhabdoid phenotype
- M8015/3 Glassy cell carcinoma
- M8020/3 Carcinoma, undifferentiated, NOS
- M8021/3 Carcinoma, anaplastic, NOS
- M8022/3 Pleomorphic carcinoma
- M8030/3 Giant cell and spindle cell carcinoma
- M8031/3 Giant cell carcinoma
- M8032/3 Spindle cell carcinoma, NOS
- M8033/3 Pseudosarcomatous carcinoma
  - Sarcomatoid carcinoma
- M8034/3 Polygonal cell carcinoma
- M8035/3 Carcinoma with osteoclast-like giant cells
- M8040/0 Tumorlet, benign
- M8040/1 Tumorlet, NOS
- M8041/3 Small cell carcinoma, NOS
  - Reserve cell carcinoma
  - Round cell carcinoma
  - Small cell neuroendocrine carcinoma
- M8042/3 Oat cell carcinoma (C34._)
- M8043/3 Small cell carcinoma, fusiform cell
- M8044/3 Small cell carcinoma, intermediate cell
- M8045/3 Combined small cell carcinoma
  - Mixed small cell carcinoma
  - Combined small cell-large cell carcinoma
  - Combined small cell-adenocarcinoma
  - Combined small cell-squamous cell carcinoma
- M8046/3 Non-small cell carcinoma (C34._)

=== 805–808 Squamous Cell Neoplasms ===
- M8050/0 Papilloma, NOS (except papilloma of bladder M8120/1)
- M8050/2 Papillary carcinoma in situ
- M8050/3 Papillary carcinoma, NOS
- M8051/0 Verrucous papilloma
- M8051/3 Verrucous carcinoma, NOS
  - Condylomatous carcinoma
  - Verrucous squamous cell carcinoma
  - Verrucous epidermoid carcinoma
  - Warty carcinoma
- M8052/0 Squamous cell papilloma, NOS
  - Squamous papilloma
  - Keratotic papilloma
- M8052/2 Papillary squamous cell carcinoma, non-invasive
  - Papillary squamous cell carcinoma in situ
- M8052/3 Papillary squamous cell carcinoma
  - Papillary epidermoid carcinoma
- M8053/0 Squamous cell papilloma, inverted
- M8060/0 Squamous papillomatosis
  - Papillomatosis, NOS
- M8070/2 Squamous cell carcinoma in situ, NOS
  - Epidermoid carcinoma in situ, NOS
  - Intraepidermal carcinoma, NOS
  - Intraepithelial squamous cell carcinoma
- M8070/3 Squamous cell carcinoma, NOS
  - Epidermoid carcinoma, NOS
  - Squamous carcinoma
  - Squamous cell epithelioma
- M8070/6 Squamous cell carcinoma, metastatic, NOS
- M8071/3 Squamous cell carcinoma, keratinizing, NOS
  - Squamous cell carcinoma, large cell, keratinizing
  - Epidermoid carcinoma, keratinizing
- M8072/3 Squamous cell carcinoma, large cell, nonkeratinizing, NOS
  - Squamous cell carcinoma, non keratinizing, NOS
  - Epidermoid carcinoma, large cell, nonkeratinizing
- M8073/3 Squamous cell carcinoma, small cell, nonkeratinizing
  - Epidermoid carcinoma, small cell, nonkeratinizing
- M8074/3 Squamous cell carcinoma, spindle cell
  - Epidermoid carcinoma, spindle cell
  - Squamous cell carcinoma, sarcomatoid
- M8075/3 Squamous cell carcinoma, adenoid
  - Squamous cell carcinoma, pseudoglandular
  - Squamous cell carcinoma, acantholytic
- M8076/2 Squamous cell carcinoma in situ with questionable stromal invasion
  - Epidermoid carcinoma in situ with questionable stromal invasion
- M8076/3 Squamous cell carcinoma, microinvasive
- M8077/2 Squamous intraepithelial neoplasia, grade III
  - Cervical intraepithelial neoplasia, grade III (C53._)
    - CIN III, NOS (C53._)
    - CIN III with severe dysplasia (C53._)
  - Vaginal intraepithelial neoplasia, grade III (C52._)
    - VAIN III (C52._)
  - Vulvar intraepithelial neoplasia, grade III (C51._)
    - VIN III (C51._)
  - Anal intraepithelial neoplasia, grade III (C21.1)
    - AIN III (C21.1)
- M8078/3 Squamous cell carcinoma with horn formation
- M8080/2 Queyrat erythroplasia (C60._)
- M8081/2 Bowen disease (C44._)
  - Intraepidermal squamous cell carcinoma, Bowen type (C44._)
- M8082/3 Lymphoepithelial carcinoma
  - Lymphoepithelioma
  - Lymphoepithelioma-like carcinoma
  - Schmincke tumor (C11._)
- M8083/3 Basaloid squamous cell carcinoma
- M8084/3 Squamous cell carcinoma, clear cell type

=== 809–811 Basal cell Neoplasms ===
- M8090/1 Basal cell tumor (C44._)
- (M8090/3) Basal cell carcinoma, NOS (C44._)
  - Basal cell epithelioma
  - Rodent ulcer
  - Pigmented basal cell carcinoma
- M8091/3 Multifocal superficial basal cell carcinoma (C44._)
  - Multicentric basal cell carcinoma
- M8092/3 Infriltrating basal cell carcinoma, NOS (C44._)
  - Infiltrating basal cell carcinoma, non-sclerosing
  - Infiltrating basal cell carcinoma, sclerosing
  - Basal cell carcinoma, morphoeic
  - Basal cell carcinoma, desmoplastic type
- M8093/3 Basal cell carcinoma, fibroepithelial (C44._)
  - Fibroepithelioma of Pinkus type
  - Fibroepithelial basal cell carcinoma, Pinkus type
  - Pinkus tumor
  - Fibroepithelioma, NOS
- M8094/3 Basosquamous carcinoma (C44._)
  - Mixed basal-squamous cell carcinoma
- M8095/3 Metatypical carcinoma
- M8096/0 Intraepidermal epithelioma of Jadassohn (C44._)
- M8097/3 Basal cell carcinoma, nodular (C44._)
  - Basal cell carcinoma, micronodular
- M8098/3 Adenoid basal carcinoma (C53._)
- M8100/0 Trichoepithelioma (C44._)
  - Brooke tumor
  - Epithelioma adenoides cysticum
- M8101/0 Trichofolliculoma (C44._)
- M8102/0 Trichilemmoma (C44._)
- M8102/3 Trichilemmocarcinoma (C44._)
  - Trichilemmal carcinoma
- M8103/0 Pilar tumor (C44._)
  - Proliferating trichilemmal cyst
  - Proliferating trichilemmal tumor
- M8110/0 Pilomatrixoma, NOS (C44._)
  - Calcifying epithelioma of Malherbe
  - Pilomatricoma, NOS
- M8110/3 Pilomatrix carcinoma (C44._)
  - Pilomatrixoma, malignant
  - Pilomatricoma, malignant
  - Matrical carcinoma

=== 812–813 Transitional cell Papillomas And Carcinomas ===
- M8120/0 Transitional cell papilloma, benign
  - Transitional papilloma
- M8120/1 Urothelial papilloma, NOS
  - Papilloma of bladder (C67._)
  - Transitional cell papilloma, NOS
- M8120/2 Transitional cell carcinoma in situ
  - Urothelial carcinoma in situ
- M8120/3 Transitional cell carcinoma, NOS
  - Urothelial carcinoma, NOS
  - Transitional carcinoma
- M8121/0 Schneiderian papilloma, NOS (C30.0, C31._)
  - Sinonasal papilloma, NOS
  - Sinonasal papilloma, exophytic
  - Sinonasal papilloma, fungiform
  - Transitional cell papilloma, inverted, benign
  - Transitional papilloma, inverted, benign
- M8121/1 Transitional cell papilloma, inverted, NOS
  - Transitional papilloma, inverted, NOS
  - Schneiderian papilloma, inverted
  - Columnar cell papilloma
  - Cylindrical cell papilloma
  - Oncocytic Schneiderian papilloma
- M8121/3 Schneiderian carcinoma (C30.0, C31._)
  - Cylindrical cell carcinoma
- M8122/3 Transitional cell carcinoma, spindle cell
  - Transitional cell carcinoma, sarcomatoid
- M8123/3 Basaloid carcinoma
- M8124/3 Cloacogenic carcinoma (C21.2)
- M8130/1 Papillary transitional cell neoplasm of low malignant potential (C67._)
  - Papillary urothelial neoplasm of low malignant potential
- M8130/2 Papillary transitional cell carcinoma, non-invasive (C67._)
  - Papillary urothelial carcinoma, non-invasive
- M8130/3 Papillary transitional cell carcinoma (C67._)
  - Papillary urothelial carcinoma
- M8131/3 Transitional cell carcinoma, micropapillary ( C67._)

=== 814–838 Adenomas And Adenocarcinomas ===
- (M8140/0) Adenoma, NOS
- M8140/1 Atypical adenoma
  - Bronchial adenoma, NOS (C34._)
- M8140/2 Adenocarcinoma in situ, NOS
- (M8140/3) Adenocarcinoma, NOS
- M8140/6 Adenocarcinoma, metastatic, NOS
- M8141/3 Scirrhous adenocarcinoma
  - Scirrhous carcinoma
  - Carcinoma with productive fibrosis
- (M8142/3) Linitis plastica (C16._)
- M8143/3 Superficial spreading adenocarcinoma
- M8144/3 Adenocarcinoma, intestinal type (C16._)
  - Carcinoma, intestinal type
- M8145/3 Carcinoma, diffuse type (C16._)
  - Adenocarcinoma, diffuse type
- M8146/0 Monomorphic adenoma
- M8147/0 Basal cell adenoma
- M8147/3 Basal cell adenocarcinoma
- M8148/2 Glandular intraepithelial neoplasia, grade III
  - Prostatic intraepithelial neoplasia, grade III (C61.9)
    - PIN III
- M8149/0 Canalicular adenoma
- M8150/0 Islet cell adenoma (C25._)
  - Islet cell tumor, benign
  - Nesidioblastoma
  - Islet cell adenomatosis
- M8150/1 Islet cell tumor, NOS (C25._)
- M8150/3 Islet cell carcinoma (C25._)
  - Islet cell adenocarcinoma
- (M8151/0) Insulinoma, NOS (C25._)
  - Beta cell adenoma
- M8151/3 Insulinoma, malignant (C25._)
  - Beta cell tumor, malignant
- (M8152/0) Glucagonoma, NOS (C25._)
  - Alpha cell tumor, NOS
- M8152/3 Glucagonoma, malignant (C25._)
  - Alpha cell tumor, malignant
- (M8153/1) Gastrinoma, NOS
  - G cell tumor, NOS
  - Gastrin cell tumor
- M8153/3 Gastinoma, malignant
  - G cell tumor, malignant
  - Gastrin cell tumor, malignant
- M8154/3 Mixed islet cell and exocrine adenocarcinoma (C25._)
  - Mixed acinar-endocrine carcinoma
  - Mixed ductal-endocrine carcinoma
- M8155/1 Vipoma, NOS
- (M8155/3) Vipoma, malignant
- M8156/1 Somatostatinoma, NOS
  - Somatostatin cell tumor, NOS
- M8156/3 Somatostatinoma, malignant
  - somatostatin cell tumor, malignant
- M8157/1 Enteroglucagonoma, NOS
- M8157/3 Enteroglucagonoma, malignant
- M8160/0 Bile duct adenoma (C22.1, C24.0)
  - Cholangioma
- (M8160/3) Cholangiocarcinoma (C22.1, C24.0)
  - Bile duct carcinoma
  - Bile duct adenocarcinoma
- M8161/0 (C22.1, C24.0)
- M8161/3 Bile duct cystadenocarcinoma (C22.1, C24.0)
- M8162/3 Klatskin tumor (C22.1, C24.0)
- M8170/0 Liver cell adenoma (C22.0)
- (M8170/3) Hepatocellular carcinoma, NOS (C22.0)
  - Liver cell carcinoma
  - Hepatocarcinoma
  - Hepatoma, malignant
  - Hepatoma, NOS
- M8171/3 Hepatocellular carcinoma, fibrolamellar (C22.0)
- M8172/3 Hepatocellular carcinoma, scirrhous (C22.0)
  - Sclerosing hepatic carcinoma
- M8173/3 Hepatocellular carcinoma, spindle cell variant (C22.0)
  - Hepatocellular carcinoma, sarcomatoid
- M8174/3 Hepatocellular carcinoma, clear cell type (C22.0)
- M8175/3 Hepatocellular carcinoma, pleomorphic type
- M8180/3 Combined hepatocellular carcinoma and cholangiocarcinoma (C22.0)
  - Mixed hepatocellular and bilde duct carcinoma
  - Hepatocholangiocarcinoma
- M8190/0 Trabecular adenoma
- M8190/3 Trabecular adenocarcinoma
  - Trabecular carcinoma
- M8191/0 Embryonal adenoma
- M8200/0 Eccrine dermal cylindroma (C44._)
  - Turban tumor
  - Cylindroma of skin
- (M8200/3) Adenoid cystic carcinoma
  - Adenocystic carcinoma
  - Cylindroma, NOS (except cylindroma of skin M8200/0)
  - Adenocarcinoma, cylindroid
  - Bronchial adenoma, cylindroid (C34._)
- M8201/2 Cribiform carcinoma in situ (C50._)
  - Ductal carcinoma in situ, cribiform type
- M8201/3 Cribiform carcinoma, NOS
  - Ductal carcinoma, cribiform type
- M8202/0 Microcystic adenoma (C25._)
- M8204/0 Lactating adenoma
- M8210/0 Adenomatous polyp, NOS
  - Polypoid adenoma
- M8210/2 Adenocarcinoma in situ in adenomatous polyp
  - Adenocarcinoma in situ in tubular adenoma
  - Carcinoma in situ in adenomatous polyp
  - Adenocarcinoma in situ in polypoid adenoma
  - Adenocarcinoma in situ in a polyp, NOS
  - Carcinoma in situ in a polyp, NOS
- M8210/3 Adenocarcinoma in adenomatous polyp
  - Adenocarcinoma in tubular adenoma
  - Carcinoma in adenomatous polyp
  - Adenocarcinoma in polypoid adenoma
  - Adenocarcinoma in a polyp, NOS
  - Carcinoma in a polyp, NOS
- M8211/0 Tubular adenoma, NOS
- M8211/3 Tubular adenocarcinoma
  - Tubular carcinoma
- M8212/0 Flat adenoma
- M8213/0 Serrated adenoma (C18._)
  - Mixed adenomatous and hyperplastic polyp
- M8214/3 Parietal cell carcinoma (C16._)
  - Parietal cell adenocarcinoma
- M8215/3 Adenocarcinoma of anal glands (C21.1)
  - Adenocarcinoma of anal ducts
- M8220/0 Adenomatous polyposis coli (C18._)
  - Familial polyposis coli
  - Adenomatosis, NOS
- M8220/3 Adenocarcinoma in adenomatous polyposis
- M8221/0 Multiple adenomatous polyps
- M8221/3 Adenocarcinoma in multiple adenomatous polyps
- M8230/2 Ductal carcinoma in situ, solid type (C50._)
  - Intraductal carcinoma, solid type
- M8230/3 Solid carcinoma, NOS
  - Solid carcinoma with mucin formation
  - Solid adenocarcinoma with mucin formation
- M8231/3 Carcinoma simplex
- (M8240/1) Carcinoid tumor of uncertain malignant potential
  - Carcinoid tumor, NOS, of appendix (C18.1)
  - Carcinoid, NOS, of appendix
  - Carcinoid tumor, argentaffin, NOS
  - Argentaffinoma, NOS
- M8240/3 Carcinoid tumor, NOS (except of appendix M8240/1)
  - Carcinoid, NOS (except of appendix)
  - Typical carcinoid
  - Bronchial adenoma, carcinoid
- M8241/3 Enterochromaffin cell carcinoid
  - Carcinoid tumor, argentaffin, malignant
  - Argentaffinoma, malignant
  - EC cell carcinoid
  - Serotonin producing carcinoid
- M8242/1 Enterochromaffin-like cell carcinoid, NOS
  - ECL cell carcinoid, NOS
- M8242/3 Enterochromaffin-like cell tumor, malignant
  - ECL cell carcinoid, malignant
- M8243/3 Goblet cell carcinoid
  - Mucocarcinoid tumor
  - Mucinous carcinoid
- M8244/3 Composite carcinoid
  - Combined carcinoid and adenocarcinoma
  - Mixed carcinoid-adenocarcinoma
- M8245/1 Tubular carcinoid
- M8245/3 Adenocarcinoid tumor
- M8246/3 Neuroendocrine carcinoma, NOS
- M8247/3 Merkel cell carcinoma (C44._)
  - Merkel cell tumor
  - Primary cutaneous neuroendocrine carcinoma
- M8248/1 Apudoma
- M8249/3 Atypical carcinoid tumor
- M8250/1 Pulmonary adenomatosis (C34._)
- M8250/3 Bronchiolo-alveolar adenocarcinoma, NOS (C34._)
  - Bronchiolo-alveolar carcinoma, NOS
  - Bronchiolar adenocarcinoma
  - Bronchiolar carcinoma
  - Alveolar cell carcinoma
- M8251/0 Alveolar adenoma (C34._)
- M8251/3 Alveolar adenocarcinoma (C34._)
  - Alveolar carcinoma
- M8252/3 Bronchiolo-alveolar carcinoma, non-mucinous (C34._)
  - Bronchiolo-alveolar carcinoma, Club cell
  - Bronchiolo-alveolar carcinoma, type II pneumocyte
- M8253/3 Bronchiolo-alveolar carcinoma, mucinous (C32._)
  - Bronchiolo-alveolar carcinoma, goblet cell type
- M8254/3 Bronchiolo-alveolar carcinoma, mixed mucinous and non-mucinous (C34._)
  - Bronchiolo-alveolar carcinoma, Club cell and goblet cell type
  - Bronchiolo-alveolar carcinoma, type II pneumocyte and goblet cell type
  - Bronchiolo-alveolar carcinoma, indeterminate type
- M8255/3 Adenocarcinoma combined with mixed subtypes
  - Adenomcarcinoma combined with other types of carcinoma
- M8260/0 Papillary adenoma, NOS
  - Glandular papilloma
- M8260/3 Papillary adenocarcinoma, NOS
  - Papillary carcinoma of thyroid (C73.9)
  - Papillary renal cell carcinoma (C64.9)
- M8261/0 Villous adenoma, NOS
  - Villous papilloma
- M8261/2 Adenocarcinoma in situ in villous adenoma
- M8261/3 Adenocarcinoma in villous adenoma
- M8262/3 Villous adenocarcinoma
- M8263/0 Tubulovillous adenoma, NOS
  - villoglandular adenoma
  - Papillotubular adenoma
- M8263/2 Adenocarcinoma in situ in tubulovillous adenoma
- M8263/3 Adenocarcinoma in tubulovillous adenoma
  - Papillotubular adenocarcinoma
  - Tubulopapillary adenocarcinoma
- M8264/0 Papillomatosis, glandular
  - Biliary papillomatosis (C22.1, C24.0)
- M8270/0 Chromophobe adenoma (C75.1)
- M8270/3 Chromophobe carcinoma (C75.1)
  - Chromophobe adenocarcinoma
- (M8271/0) Prolactinoma (C75.1)
- M8272/0 Pituitary adenoma, NOS (C75.1)
- M8272/3 Pituitary carcinoma, NOS (C75.1)
- M8280/0 Acidophil adenoma (C75.1)
  - Eosinophil adenoma
- M8280/3 Acidophil carcinoma (C75.1)
  - Acidophil adenocarcinoma
  - Eosinophil carcinoma
  - Eosinophil adenocarcinoma
- M8281/0 Mixed acidophil-basophil adenoma (C75.1)
- (M8290/0) Oxyphilic adenoma
  - Oncocytic adenoma
  - Oncocytoma
  - Hurthle cell adenoma (C73.9)
  - Hurthle cell tumor
  - Follicular adenoma, oxyphilic cell (C73.9)
- M8290/3 Oxyphilic adenocarcinoma
  - Oncocytic carcinoma
  - Oncocytic adenocarcinoma
  - Hurthlecell carcinoma (C73.9)
  - Hurthle cell adenocarcinoma
  - Follicular carcinoma, oxyphilic cell (C73.9)
- M8300/0 Basophil adenoma (C75.1)
  - Mucoid cell adenoma
- M8300/3 Basophil carcinoma (C75.1)
  - Basophil adenocarcinoma
  - Mucoid cell adenocarcinoma
- M8310/0 Clear cell adenoma
- M8310/3 Clear cell adenocarcinoma, NOS
  - Clear cell carcinoma
  - Clear cell adenocarcinoma, mesonephroid
- M8311/1 Hypernephroid tumor
- (M8312/3) Renal cell carcinoma, NOS (C64.9)
  - Renal cell adenocarcinoma
  - Grawitz tumor
  - Hypernephroma
- M8313/0 Clear cell adenofibroma (C56.9)
  - clear cell cystadenofibroma
- M8313/1 Clear cell adenofibroma of borderline malignancy
  - Clear cell cystadenofibroma of borderline malignancy
- M8313/3 Clear cell adenocarcinofibroma (C56.9)
  - Clear cell cystadenocarcinofibroma
- M8314/3 Lipid-rich carcinoma (C50._)
- M8315/3 Glycogen-rich carcinoma
- M8316/3 Cyst-associated renal cell carcinoma (C64.9)
- M8317/3 Renal cell carcinoma, chromophobe type (C64.9)
  - Chromophobe cell renal carcinoma
- M8318/3 Renal cell carcinoma, sarcomatoid (C64.9)
  - Renal cell carcinoma, spindle cell
- M8319/3 collecting duct carcinoma (C64.9)
  - Bellini duct carcinoma
  - Renal carcinoma, collecting duct type
- M8320/3 Granular cell carcinoma
  - Granular cell adenocarcinoma
- M8321/0 Chief cell adenoma (C75.0)
- M8322/0 Water-clear cell adenoma (C75.0)
- M8322/3 Water-clear cell adenocarcinoma (C75.0)
  - Water-celar cell carcinoma
- M8323/0 Mixed cell adenoma
- M8323/3 Mixed cell adenocarcinoma
- M8324/0 Lipoadenoma
  - Adenolipoma
- M8325/0 Metanephric adenoma (C64.9)
- M8330/0 Follicular adenoma (C73.9)
- M8330/1 Atypical follicular adenoma (C73.9)
- M8330/3 Follicular adenocarcinoma, NOS (C73.9)
  - Follicular carcinoma, NOS
- M8331/3 Follicular adenocarcinoma, well differentiated (C73.9)
  - Follicular carcinoma, well differentiated
- M8332/3 Follicular adenocarcinoma, trabecular (C73.9)
  - Follicular carcinoma, trabecular
  - Follicular adenocarcinoma, moderately differentiated
  - FOlloicular carcinoma, moderately differentiated
- M8333/0 Microfollicular adenoma, NOS (C73.9)
  - Fetal adenoma
- M8333/3 Fetal adenocarcinoma
- M8334/0 Macrofollicular adenoma (C73.9)
  - Colloid adenoma
- M8335/3 Follicular carcinoma, minimally invasive (C73.9)
  - Follicular carcinoma, encapsulated
- M8336/0 Hyalinizing trabecular adenoma (C73.9)
- (M8337/3)Insular carcinoma (C73.9)
- M8340/3 Papillary carcinoma, follicular variant (C73.9)
  - Papillary adenocarcinoma, follicular variant
  - Papillary and follicular adenocarcinoma
  - Papillary and follicular carcinoma
- M8341/3 Papillary microcarcinoma (C73.9)
- M8342/3 Papillary carcinoma, oxyphilic cell (C73.9)
- M8343/3 Papillary carcinoma, encapsulated (C73.9)
- M8344/3 Papillary carcinoma, columnar cell (C73.9)
  - Papillary carcinoma, tall cell
- M8345/3 Medullary carcinoma with amyloid stroma (C73.9)
  - Parafollicular cell carcinoma
  - C cell carcinoma
- M8346/3 Mixed medullary-follicular carcinoma (C73.9)
- M8347/3 Mixed medullary-papillary carcinoma (C73.9)
- M8350/3 Nonencapsulated sclerosing carcinoma (C73.9)
  - Nonencapsulated sclerosing adenocarcinoma
  - Nonencapsulated sclerosing tumor
  - Papillary carcinoma, diffuse sclerosing
- M8360/1 Multiple endocrine adenomas
  - Endocrine adenomatosis
- M8361/0 Juxtaglomerular tumor (C64.9)
  - Reninoma
- M8370/0 Adrenal cortical adenoma, NOS (C74.0)
  - Adrenal cortical tumor, benign
  - Adrenal cortical tumor, NOS
- M8370/3 Adrenal cortical carcinoma (C74.0)
  - Adrenal cortical adenocarcinoma
  - Adrenal cortical tumor, malignant
- M8371/0 Adrenal cortical adenoma, compact cell (C74.0)
- M8372/0 Adrenal cortical adenoma, pigmented (C74.0)
  - Black adenoma
  - Pigmented adenoma
- M8373/0 Adrenal cortical adenoma, clear cell (C74.0)
- M8374/0 Adrenal cortical adenoma, glomerulosa cell (C74.0)
- M8375/0 Adrenal cortical adenoma, mixed cell (C74.0)
- (M8380/0) Endometrioid adenoma, NOS
  - Endometrioid cystadenoma, NOS
- M8380/1 Endometrioid adenoma, borderline malignancy
  - Endometrioid cystadenoma, borderline malignancy
  - Endometrioid tumor of low malignant potential
  - Atypical proliferative endometrioid tumor
- M8380/3 Endometrioid adenocarcinoma, NOS
  - Endometrioid carcinoma, NOS
  - Endometrioid cystadenocarcinoma
- M8381/0 Endometrioid adenofibroma, NOS
  - Endometrioid cystadenofibroma, NOS
- M8381/1 Endometrioid adenofibroma, borderline malignancy
  - Endometrioid cystadenofibroma, borderline malignancy
- M8381/3 Endometriod adenofibroma, malignant
  - Endometrioid cystadenofibroma, malignant
- M8382/3 Endometrioid adenocarcinoma, secretory variant
- M8383/3 Endometrioid adenocarcinoma, ciliated cell variant
- M8384/3 Adenocarcinoma, endocervical type

=== 839–842 Adnexal And Skin appendage Neoplasms ===
M8390/0 Skin appendage adenoma (C44._)

- Skin appendage tumor, benign
- Adnexal tumor, benign

M8390/3 Skin appendage carcinoma (C44._)

- Adnexal carcinoma

M8391/0 Follicular fibroma (C44._)

- Trichodiscoma
- Fibrofolliculoma
- Perifollicular fibroma

M8392/0 Syringofibroadenoma (C44._)

M8400/0 Sweat gland adenoma (C44._)

- Sweat gland tumor, benign
- Hidradenoma, NOS
- Syringadenoma, NOS

M8400/1 Sweat gland tumor, NOS (C44._)

M8400/3 Sweat gland adenocarcinoma (C44._)

- Sweat gland carcinoma
- Sweat gland tumor, malignant

M8401/0 Apocrine adenoma

- Apocrine cystadenoma

M8401/3 Apocrine adenocarcinoma

M8402/0 Nodular hidradenoma (C44._)

- Eccrine acrospiroma
- Clear cell hidradenoma

M8402/3 Nodular hidradenoma, malignant (C44._)

- Hidradenocarcinoma

M8403/0 Eccrine spiradenoma (C44._)

- Spiradenoma, NOS

M8403/3 Malignant eccrine spiradenoma (C44._) M8404/0 Hidrocystoma (C44._)

- Eccrine cystadenoma

M8405/0 Papillary hidradenoma

- Hidradenoma papilliferum

M8406/0 Papillary syringadenoma (C44._)

- Papillary syringocystadenoma
- Syringocystadenoma papilliferum

M8407/0 Syringoma, NOS (C44._)

M8407/3 Sclerosing sweat duct carcinoma (C44._)

- Syringomatous carcinoma
- Microcystic adnexal carcinoma

M8408/0 Eccrine papillary adenoma (C44._)

M8408/1 Aggressive digital papillary adenoma (C44._)

M8408/3 Eccrine papillary adenocarcinoma (C44._)

- Digital papillary adenocarcinoma

M8409/0 Eccrine poroma (C44._)

M8410/0 Sebaceous adenoma (C44._)

M8410/3 Sebaceous adenocarcinoma (C44._)

- Sebaceous carcinoma

M8413/3 Eccrine adenocarcinoma (C44._)

M8420/0 Ceruminous adenoma (C44.2)

M8420/3 Ceruminous adenocarcinioma (C44.2)

- Ceruminous carcinoma

=== 843 Mucoepidermoid Neoplasms ===
M8430/1 Mucoepidermoid tumor

M8430/3 Mucoepidermoid carcinoma

=== 844–849 Cystic, Mucinous And Serous Neoplasms ===
M8440/0 Cystadenoma, NOS

- Cystoma, NOS

M8440/3 Cystadenocarcinoma, NOS

M8441/0 Serous cystadenoma, NOS

- Serous cystoma
- Serous microcystic adenoma

M8441/3 Serous cystadenocarcinoma, NOS (C56.9)

- Serous adenocarcinoma, NOS
- Serous carcinoma, NOS

M8442/1 Serous cystadenoma, borderline malignancy (C56.9)

- Serous tumor, NOS, of low malignant potential
- Atypical proliferating serous tumor

M8443/0 Clear cell cystadenoma (C56.9)

M8444/1 Clear cell cystic tumor of borderline malignancy (C56.9)

- Atypical proliferating clear cell tumor

M8450/0 Papillary cystadenoma, NOS (C56.9)

M8450/3 Papillary cystadenocarcinoma, NOS (C56.9)

- Papillocystic adenocarcinoma

M8451/1 Papillary cystadenoma, borderline malignancy (C56.9)

M8452/1 Solid pseudo papillary tumor (C25._)

- Papillary cystic tumor
- Solid and papillary epithelial neoplasm
- Solid and cystic tumor

M8452/3 Solid pseudopapillary carcinoma (C25._)

M8453/0 Intraductal papillary-mucinous adenoma (C25._)

M8453/1 Intraductal papillary-mucinous tumor with moderate dysplasia (C25._)

M8453/2 Intraductal papillary-mucinous carcinoma, non-invasive (C25._)

M8453/3 Intraductal papillary-mucinous carcinoma invasive (C25._)

M8454/0 Cystic tumor of atrio-ventricular node (C38.0)

M8460/0 Papillary serous cystadenoma, NOS (C56.9)

M8460/3 Papillary serous cystadenocarcinoma (C56.9)

- Papillary serous adenocarcinoma
- Micropapillary serous carcinoma

M8461/0 Serous surface papilloma (C56.9)

M8461/3 Serous surface papillary carcinoma (C56.9)

- Primary serous papillary carcinoma of peritoneum (C48.1)

M8462/1 Serous papillary cystic tumor of borderline malignancy (C56.9)

- Papillary serous cystadenoma, borderline malignancy
- Papillary serous tumor of low malignant potential
- Atypical proliferative papillary serous tumor

M8463/1 Serous surface papillary tumor of borderline malignancy (C56.9)

M8470/0 Mucinous cystadenoma, NOS (C56.9)

- Mucinous cystoma
- Pseudomucinous cystadenoma, NOS

M8470/1 Mucinous cystic tumor with moderate dysplasia (C25._)

M8470/2 Mucinous cystadenocarcinoma, non-invasive (C25._)

M8470/3 Mucinous cystadenocarcinoma/ NOS (C56.9)

- Pseudomucinous adenocarcinoma
- Pseudomucinous cystadenocarcinoma, NOS

M8471/0 Papillary mucinous cystadenoma, NOS (C56.9)

- Papillary pseudomucinous cystadenoma, NOS

M8471/3 papillary mucinous cystadenocarcinoma (C56.9)

- Papillary pseudomucinous cystadenocarcinoma

M8472/1 Mucinous cystic tumor of borderline malignancy (C56.9)

- Mucinous cystadenoma, borderline malignancy
- Pseudomucinous cystadenoma, borderline malignancy
- Mucinous tumor, NOS, of low malignant potential
- Atypical proliferative mucinous tumor

M8473/1 Papillary mucinous cystadenoma, borderline malignancy (C56.9)

- Papillary pseudomucinous cystadenoma borderline malignancy
- Papillary mucinous tumor of low malignant potential

M8480/0 Mucinous adenoma

M8480/3 Mucinous adenocarcinoma

- Mucinous carcinoma
- Colloid adenocarcinoma
- Colloid carcinoma
- Gelatinous adenocarcinoma
- Gelatinous carcinoma
- Mucoid adenocarcinoma
- Mucoid carcinoma
- Mucous adenocarcinoma
- Mucous carcinoma
- Pseudomyxoma peritonei with unknown primary site (C80.9)

M8480/6 Pseudomyxoma peritonei

M8481/3 Mucin-producing adenocarcinoma

- Mucin-producing carcinoma
- Mucin-secreting adenocarcinoma
- Mucin-secreting carcinoma

M8482/3 Mucinous adenocarcinoma, endocervical type

M8490/3 Signet ring cell carcinoma

- Signet ring cell adenocarcinoma

M8490/6 Metastatic signet ring cell carcinoma

- Krukenberg tumor

=== 850–854 Ductal, Lobular And Medullary Neoplasms ===
M8500/2 Intraductal carcinoma, noninfiltrating, NOS

- Intraductal adenocarcinoma, noninfiltrating, NOS
- Intraductal carcinoma, NOS
- Ductal carcinoma in situ, NOS (C50._)
- DCIS, NOS
- Ductal intraepithelial neoplasia 3
- DIN 3

M8500/3 Infiltrating duct carcinoma, NOS (C50._)

- Infiltrating duct adenocarcinoma
- Duct adenocarcinoma, NOS
- Duct carcinoma, NOS
- Duct cell carcinoma
- Ductal carcinoma, NOS

M8501/2 Comedocarcinoma, noninfiltrating (C50._)

- Ductal carcinoma in situ, comedo type
- DCIS, comedo type

M8501/3 Comedocarcinoma, NOS (C50._)

M8502/3 Secretory carcinoma of breast (C50._)

- Juvenile carcinoma of breast

M8503/0 Intraductal papilloma

- Duct adenoma, NOS
- Ductal papilloma

M8503/2 Noninfiltrating intraductal papillary adenocarcinoma (C50._)

- Noninfiltrating intraductal papillary carcinoma
- Intraductal papillary adenocarcinoma, NOS
- Intraductal papillary carcinoma, NOS
- Ductal carcinoma in situ, papillary
- DCIS, papillary

M8503/3 Intraductal papillary adenocarcinoma with invasion (C50._)

- Infiltrating papillary adenocarcinoma
- Infiltrating and papillary adenocarcinoma

M8504/0 Intracystic papillary adenoma

- Intracystic papilloma

M8504/2 Noninfiltrating intracystic carcinoma

M8504/3 Intracystic carcinoma, NOS

- Intracystic papillary adenocarcinoma

M8505/0 Intraductal papillomatosis, NOS

- Diffuse intraductal papillomatosis

M8506/0 Adenoma of nipple (C50._)

- Subareolar duct papillomatosis

M8507/2 Intraductal micropapillary carcinoma (C50._)

- Ductal carcinoma in situ, micropapillary
- Intraductal carcinoma, clinging

M8508/3 Cystic hypersecretory carcinoma (C50._)

M8510/3 Medullary carcinoma, NOS

- Medullary adenocarcinoma

M8512/3 Medullary carcinoma with lymphoid stroma

M8513/3 Atypical medullary carcinoma (C50._)

M8514/3 Duct carcinoma, desmoplastic type

M8520/2 Lobular carcinoma in situ, NOS (C50._)

- Lobular carcinoma, noninfiltrating
- LCIS, NOS

M8520/3 Lobular carcinoma, NOS (C50._)

- Lobular adenocarcinoma
- Infiltrating lobular carcinoma, NOS

M8521/3 Infiltrating ductular carcinoma (C50._)

M8522/2 Intraductal carcinoma and lobular carcinoma in situ (C50._)

M8522/3 Infiltrating duct and lobular carcinoma (C50._)

- Lobular and ductal carcinoma
- Infiltrating duct and lobular carcinoma in situ
- Intraductal and lobular carcinoma
- Infiltrating lobular carcinoma and ductal carcinoma in situ

M8523/3 Infiltrating duct mixed with other types of carcinoma (C50._)

- Infiltrating duct and cribiform carcinoma
- Infiltrating duct and mucinous carcinoma
- Infiltrating duct and tubular carcinoma
- Infiltrating duct and colloid carcinoma

M8524/3 Infiltrating lobular mixed with other types of carcinoma (C50._)

M8525/3 Polymorphous low grade adenocarcinoma

- Terminal duct adenocarcinoma

M8530/3 Inflammatory carcinoma (C50._)

- Inflammatory adenocarcinoma

M8540/3 Paget disease, mammary (C50._)

- Paget disease of breast

M8541/3 Paget disease and infiltrating duct carcinoma of breast (C50._)

M8542/3 Paget disease, extramammary (except Paget disease of bone)

M8543/3 Paget disease and intraductal carcinoma of breast (C50._)

=== 8550 Acinar cell neoplasms ===
M8550/0 Acinar cell adenoma

- Acinar adenoma
- Acinic cell adenoma

M8550/1 Acinar cell tumor

- Acinic cell tumor

M8550/3 Acinar cell carcinoma

- Acinic cell adenocarcinoma
- Acinar adenocarcinoma
- Acinar carcinoma

M8551/3 Acinar cell cystadenocarcinoma

=== 856–857 Complex epithelial neoplasms ===
M8560/0 Mixed squamous cell and glandular papilloma

M8560/3 Adenosquamous carcinoma

- Mixed adenocarcinoma and squamous cell carcinoma
- Mixed adenocarcinoma and epidermoid carcinoma

M8561/0 Adenolymphoma (C07._, C08._)

- Warthin's tumor
- Papillary cystadenoma lymphomatosum

M8562/3 Epithelial-myoepithelial carcinoma

M8570/3 Adenocarcinoma with squamous metaplasia

- Adenoacanthoma

M8571/3 Adenocarcinoma with cartilaginous and osseous metaplasia

- Adenocarcinoma with cartilaginous metaplasia
- Adenocarcinoma with osseous metaplasia

M8572/3 Adenocarcinoma with spindle cell metaplasia

M8573/3 Adenocarcinoma with apocrine metaplasia

- Carcinoma with apocrine metaplasia

M8574/3 Adenocarcinoma with neuroendocrine differentiation

- Carcinoma with neuroendocrine differentiation

M8575/3 Metaplastic carcinoma, NOS

M8576/3 Hepatoid adenocarcinoma

- Hepatoid carcinoma

=== 858 Thymic Epithelial Neoplasms ===
- M8580/0 Thymoma, benign (C37.9)
- M8580/1 Thymoma, NOS (C37.9)
- M8580/3 Thymoma, malignant, NOS (C37.9)
- M8581/1 Thymoma, type A, NOS (C37.9)
- Thymoma, spindle cell, NOS
- Thymoma, medullary, NOS

M8581/3 Thymoma, type A, malignant (C37.9)

- Thymoma, spindle cell, malignant
- Thymoma, medullary, malignant

M8582/1 Thymoma, type AB, NOS (C37.9)

- Thymoma, mixed type, NOS

M8582/3 thymoma, type AB, malignant (C37.9)

- Thymoma, mixed type, malignant

M8583/1 Thymoma, type B1, NOS (C37.9)

- Thymoma, lymphocyte-rich, NOS
- Thymoma, lymphocytic, NOS
- Thymoma, predominantly cortical, NOS
- Thymoma, organoid, NOS

M8583/3 Thymoma, type B1, malignant (C37.9)

- Thymoma, lymphocyte-rich, malignant
- Thymoma, lymphocytic, malignant
- Thymoma, predominantly cortical, malignant
- Thymoma, organoid, malignant

M8584/1 Thymoma, type B2, NOS (C37.9)

- Thymoma, cortical, NOS

M8584/3 Thymoma, type B2, malignant (C37.9)

- Thymoma, cortical, malignant

M8585/1 Thymoma, type B3, NOS (C37.9)

- Thymoma, epithelial, NOS
- Thymoma, atypical, NOS

M8585/3 Thymoma, type B3, malignant (C37.9)

- Thymoma, epithelial, malignant
- Thymoma, atypical, malignant
- Well differentiated thymic carcinoma

M8586/3 Thymic carcinoma, NOS (C37.9)

- Thymoma, type C

M8587/0 Ectopic hamartomatous thymoma

M8588/3 Spindle epithelial tumor with thymus-like element

- Spindle epithelial tumor with thymus-like differentiation
- SETTLE

M8589/3 Carcinoma showing thymus-like element

- Carcinoma showing thymus-like differentiation
- CASTLE

=== 859–867 Specialized gonadal neoplasms ===
M8590/1 Sex cord-stromal tumor, NOS

- Sex cord/gonadal stromal tumor, NOS
- Testicular/ovarian stromal tumor

M8591/1 Sex cord-gonadal stromal tumor, incompletely differentiated

M8592/1 Sex cord-gonadal stromal tumor, mixed forms

M8593/1 Stromal tumor with minor sex cord elements

M8600/0 Thecoma, NOS

- Theca cell tumor

M8600/3 Thecoma, malignant

M8601/0 Thecoma, luteinized

M8602/0 Sclerosing stromal tumor

M8610/0 Luteoma, NOS

- Luteinoma

M8620/1 Granulosa cell tumor, NOS

- adult type

M8620/3 Granulosa cell tumor, malignant

- Granulosa cell carcinoma
- Granulosa cell tumor, sarcomatoid

M8621/1 Granulosa cell-theca cell tumor

- Theca cell-granulosa cell tumor

M8622/1 Granulosa cell tumor, juvenile

M8623/1 Sex cord tumor with annular tubules

M8630/1 Androblastoma/Arrhenoblastoma, benign

M8630/1 Androblastoma/Arrhenoblastoma, NOS

M8630/3 Androblastoma/Arrhenoblastoma, malignant

M8631/0 Sertoli-Leydig cell tumor, well differentiated

M8631/1 Sertoli-Leydig cell tumor of intermediate differentiation

- Sertoli-Leydig cell tumor, NOS

M8631/3 Sertoli-Leydig cell tumor, poorly differentiated

- Sertoli-Leydig cell tumor, sarcomatoid

M8632/1 Gynandroblastoma

M8633/1 Sertoli-Leydig cell tumor, retiform

M8634/1 Sertoli-Leydig cell tumor, intermediate differentiation, with heterologous elements

- retiform, with heterologous elements

M8634/3 Sertoli-Leydig cell tumor, poorly differentiated, with heterologous elements

M8640/1 Sertoli tumor, NOS

- Pick tubular adenoma
- Sertoli cell adenoma
- Tubular androblastoma, NOS
- Testicular adenoma

M8640/3 Sertoli cell carcinoma (C62._)

M8641/0 Sertoli cell tumor with lipid storage

- Folliculome lipidique (C56.9)
- Tubular androblastoma with lipid storage
- Lipid-rich Sertoli cell tumor

M8642/1 large cell calcifying Sertoli cell tumor

M8650/0 Leydig cell tumor, benign (C62._)

M8650/3 Leydig cell tumor, malignant

- Interstitial cell tumor, malignant

M8660/0 Hilus cell tumor (C56.9)

- Hilar cell tumor

M8670/0 Lipid cell tumor of ovary (C56.9)

- Lipoid cell tumor of ovary
- Steroid cell tumor, NOS
- Masculinovoblastoma

M8670/3 Steroid cell tumor, malignant

M8641/0 Adrenal rest tumor

=== 868–871 Paragangliomas And Glomus tumors ===
M8680/0 Paraganglioma, benign

M8680/1 Paraganglioma, NOS

M8680/3 paraganglioma, malignant

M8681/1 Sympathetic paraganglioma

M8682/1 Parasympathetic paraganglioma

M8683/0 Gangliocytic paraganglioma (C17.0)

M8690/1 Glomus jugulare tumor, NOS (C75.5)

- Jugular/jugulotympanic paranglioma

M8691/1 Aortic body tumor (C75.5)

- Aortic/aorticopulmonary paraganglioma

M8692/1 Carotid body tumor/paraganglioma (C75.4)

M8693/1 Extra-adrenal paraganglioma, NOS

- Nonchromaffin paraganglioma, NOS
- Chemodectoma

M8693/3 Extra-adrenal paraganglioma, malignant

- Nonchromaffin paraganglioma, malignant

M8700/0 Pheochromocytoma, NOS (C74.1)

- Adrenal medullary/chromaffin paraganglioma
- Chromaffin tumor
- Chromaffinoma

M8700/3 Pheochromocytoma, malignant (C74.1)

- Adrenal medullary paraganglioma, malignant
- Pheochromoblastoma

M8710/3 Glomangiosarcoma

- Glomoid sarcoma

M8711/0 Glomus tumor, NOS

M8711/3 Glomus tumor, Malignant

M8712/0 Glomangioma

M8713/0 Glomangiomyoma

=== 872–879 Nevi And Melanomas ===
M8720/0 Pigmented nevus, NOS

- Melanocytic nevus
- Nevus, NOS
- Hairy nevus

M8720/2 Melanoma in situ

M8720/3 Malignant melanoma, NOS (except juvenile melanoma M8770/0)

- Melanoma, NOS

M8721/3 Nodular melanoma

M8722/0 Balloon cell nevus

M8722/3 Balloon cell melanoma

M8723/0 Halo nevus

- Regressing nevus

M8723/3 Malignant melanoma, regressing

M8725/0 Neuronevus

M8726/0 Magnocellular nevus (C69.4)

- Melanocytoma, eyeball
- Melanocytoma, NOS

M8727/0 Dysplastic nevus

M8727/0 dysplastic nevus

M8728/0 Diffuse melanocytosis

M8728/1 Meningeal melanocytoma (C70.9)

M8728/3 Meningeal melanomatosis (C70.9)

M8730/0 Nonpigmented nevus

- Achromic nevus

M8740/0 Junctional nevus, NOS

- Intraepidermal nevus

M8740/3 Malignant melanoma in junctional nevus

M8741/2 Precancerous melanosis, NOS

M8741/3 Malignant melanoma in precancerous melanosis

M8742/3 Lentigo maligna melanoma

- Hutchinson melanotic freckle

M8743/3 Superficial spreading melanoma

M8744/3 Acral lentiginous melanoma, malignant

M8745/3 * Desmoplastic melanoma, malignant

- Neurotropic melanoma, malignant
- Melanoma, desmoplastic, amelanotic

M8746/3 Mucosal lentiginous melanoma

M8750/0 Intradermal nevus

- Dermal nevus

M8760/0 compound nevus

- Dermal and epidermal nevus

M8761/0 Small congenital nevus

M8761/1 Giant pigmented nevus, NOS

- Intermediate and giant congenital nevus

M8761/3 Malignant melanoma in giant pigmented nevus/congenital melanocytic nevus

M78762/1 Proliferative dermal lesion in congenital nevus

M8770/0 Epithelioid and spindle cell nevus

- Juvenile nevus
- Juvenile melanoma
- Spitz nevus
- Pigmented spindle cell nevus of Reed

M8770/3 Mixed epithelioid and spindle cell melanoma

M8771/0 Epithelioid cell nevus

M8771/3 Epithelioid cell melanoma

M8772/0 spindle cell nevus, NOS

M8772/3 Spindle cell melanoma, NOS

M8773/3 Spindle cell melanoma, type A

M8774/3 Spindle cell melanoma, type B

M8780/0 Blue nevus, NOS

- Jadassohn blue nevus

M8780/3 blue nevus, malignant

M8790/0 Cellular blue nevus

=== 880 Soft tissue Tumors And Sarcomas, NOS ===
M8800/0 Soft tissue tumor, benign

M8800/3 Sarcoma, NOS

- Soft tissue sarcoma
- Soft tissue/mesenchymal tumor, malignant

M8800/9 Sarcomatosis, NOS

M8801/3 Spindle cell sarcoma

M8802/3 Giant cell sarcoma (except of bone M9250/3)

- Pleomorphic cell sarcoma

M8803/3 Small cell sarcoma

- Round cell sarcoma

M8804/3 Epithelioid sarcoma

- Epithelioid cell sarcoma

M8805/3 Undifferentiated sarcoma

M8806/3 Desmoplastic small round cell tumor

=== 881–883 Fibromatous neoplasms ===
M8810/0 Fibroma, NOS

M8810/1 Cellular fibroma (C56.9)

M8810/3 Fibrosarcoma, NOS

M8811/0 Fibromyxoma

- Myxoid fibroma
- Myxofibroma, nos

M8811/3 Fibromyxosarcoma

M8812/0 Periosteal fibroma (C40._, C41._)

- Periosteal sarcoma, NOS

M8813/0 Fascial fibroma

M8813/3 Fascial fibrosarcoma

M8814/3 Infantile fibrosarcoma

- Congenital fibrosarcoma

M8815/0 Solitary fibrous tumor

- Localized fibrous tumor

M8815/3 Solitary fibrous tumor, malignant

M8820/0 Elastofibroma

M8821/1 Aggressive fibromatosis

- Extra-abdominal desmoid
- Desmoid, NOS
- Invasive fibroma

M8822/1 Abdominal fibromatosis

- Abdominal desmoid
- Mesenteric fibromatosis (C48.1)
- Retroperitoneal fibromatosis (C48.0)

M8823/0 Desmoplastic fibroma

M8824/0 Myofibroma

M8824/1 Myofibromatosis

- Congenital generalized fibromatosis
- Infantile myofibromatosis

M8825/0 Myofibroblastoma

M8825/1 Myofibroblastic tumor, nos

- Inflammatory myofibroblastic tumor

M8826/0 Angiomyofibroblastoma

M8827/1 Myobfibroblastic tumor, peribronchial (C34._)

- congenital peribronchial myofibroblastic tumor

M8830/0 Benign fibrous histiocytoma

- Fibrous histiocytoma, NOS
- Fibroxanthoma, NOS
- Xantofibroma

M8830/1 Atypical fibrous histiocytoma

- Atypical fibroxanthoma

M8830/3 Malignant fibrous histiocytoma

- Fibroxanthoma, malignant

M8831/0 Histiocytoma, NOS

- Deep histiocytoma
- Juvenile histiocytoma
- Reticulohistiocytoma

M8832/0 Dermatofibroma, NOS (C44._)

- Sclerosing hemangioma
- Cutaneous histiocytoma
- Subepidermal nodular fibrosis
- Dermatofibroma lenticulare

M8832/3 Dermatofibrosarcoma, NOS (C44._)

- Dermatofibrosarcoma protuberans, NOS

M8833/3 Pigmented dermatofibrosarcoma protuberans

- Bednar tumor

M8834/1 Giant-cell fibroblastoma

M8835/1 Plexiform fibrohistiocytic tumor

M8836/1 Angiomatoid fibrous histiocytoma

=== 884 Myxomatous neoplasms ===
M8840/0 Myxoma, NOS

M8840/3 Myxosarcoma

M8841/1 Angiomyxoma

- Aggressive angiomyxoma

M8842/0 Ossifying fibromyxoid tumor

=== 885–888 Lipomatous neoplasms ===
M8850/0 Lipoma, NOS

M8850/1 Atypical lipoma

- Superficial well differentiated liposarcoma
- Well differentiated liposarcoma of superficial soft tissue

M8850/3 Liposarcoma, NOS

- Fibroliposarcoma

M8851/0 Fibrolipoma

M8851/3 Liposarcoma, well differentiated

- Liposarcoma, differentiated
- Lipoma-like liposarcoma
- Sclerosing liposarcoma
- Inflammatory liposarcoma

M8852/0 Fibromyxolipoma

- Myxolipoma

M8852/3 Myxoid liposarcoma

- Myxoliposarcoma

M8853/3 Round cell liposarcoma

M8854/0 Pleomorphic lipoma

M8854/3 Pleomorphic liposarcoma

M8855/3 Mixed liposarcoma

M8856/0 Intramuscular lipoma

- Infiltrating lipoma/angiolipoma

M8857/0 Spindle cell lipoma

M8857/3 Fibroblastic liposarcoma

M8858/3 Dedifferentiated liposarcoma

M8860/0 Angiomyolipoma

M8861/0 Angiolipoma, NOS

M8862/0 Chondroid lipoma

M8870/0 Myelolipoma

M8880/0 Hibernoma

- Fetal fat cell lipoma
- Brown fat tumor

M8881/0 Lipoblastomatosis

- Fetal lipoma, NOS
- Fetal lipomatosis
- Lipoblastoma

=== 889–892 Myomatous neoplasms ===
M8890/0 Leiomyoma, NOS

- Fibroid uterus (C55.9)
- Fibromyoma
- Leiomyofibroma
- Plexiform leiomyoma
- Lipoleiomyoma

M8890/1 Leiomyomatosis, NOS

- Intravascular leiomyomatosis

M8890/3 Leiomyosarcoma, NOS

M8891/0 Epithelioid leiomyoma

- Leiomyoblastoma

M8891/3 Epithelioid leiomyosarcoma

M8892/0 Cellular leiomyoma

M8893/0 Bizarre leiomyoma

- Symplastic/atypical/pleomorphic leiomyoma

M8894/0 Angiomyoma

- Vascular leiomyoma
- Angioleiomyoma

M8894/3 Angiomyosarcoma

M8895/0 Myoma

M8895/3 Myosarcoma

M8896/3 Myxoid leiomyosarcoma

M8897/1 Smooth muscle tumor of uncertain malignant potential

- Smooth muscle tumor, NOS

M8898/1 Metastasizing leiomyoma

M8900/0 Rhabdomyoma, NOS

M8900/3 Rhabdomyosarcoma, NOS

- Rhabdosarcoma

M8901/3 Pleomorphic rhabdomyosarcoma, adult type

- Pleomorphic rhabdomyosarcoma, NOS

M8902/3 Mixed type rhabdomyosarcoma

- Mixed embryonal rhabdomyosarcoma and alveolar rhabdomyosarcoma

M8903/0 Fetal rhabdomyoma

M8904/0 Adult rhabdomyoma

- Glycogenic rhabdomyoma

M8905/0 Genital rhabdomyoma

M8910/3 Embryonal rhabdomyosarcoma, NOS

- Embryonal rhabdomyosarcoma, pleomorphic
- Sarcoma botryoides
- Botryoid sarcoma

M8912/3 Spindle cell rhabdomyosarcoma

M8920/3 Alveolar rhabdomyosarcoma

M8921/3 Rhabdomyosarcoma with ganglionic differentiation

- Ectomesenchymoma

=== 893–899 Complex Mixed And Stromal Neoplasms ===
M8930/0 Endometrial stromal nodule

M8930/3 Endometrial stromal sarcoma, NOS

- Endometrial sarcoma, NOS
- Endometrial stromal sarcoma, high grade

M8931/3 Endometrial stromal sarcoma, low grade

- Endolymphatic stromal myosis
- Endometrial stromatosis
- Stromal endometriosis
- Stromal myosis, NOS

M8932/0 Adenomyoma

- Atypical polypoid adenomyoma

M8933/3 Adenosarcoma

M8934/3 Carcinofibroma

M8935/0 Stromal tumor, benign

M9835/1 Stromal tumor, NOS

M8935/3 Stromal sarcoma, NOS

M8936/0 Gastrointestinal stromal tumor, benign

- GIST, benign

M8936/1 Gastrointestinal stromal tumor, NOS

- GIST, NOS/uncertain malignant potential
- Gastrointestinal autonomic nerve tumor (GANT)
- Gastrointestinal pacemaker cell tumor

M8936/3 Gastrointestinal stromal sarcoma

- GIST, malignant

M8940/0 Pleomorphic adenoma

- Mixed tumor, NOS
- Mixed tumor, salivary gland type, NOS
- Chondroid syringoma

M8940/3 Mixed tumor, malignant, NOS

- Mixed tumor, malignant, NOS
- Mixed tumor, salivary gland type, malignant
- Malignant chondroid syringoma

M8941/3 Carcinoma in pleomorphic adenoma

M8950/3 Müllerian mixed tumor

M8951/3 Mesodermal mixed tumor

M8959/0 Benign cystic nephroma

M8959/1 Cystic partially differentiated nephroblastoma

M8959/3 Malignant cystic nephroma

- Malignant multilocular cystic nephroma

M8960/1 Mesoblastic nephroma

M8960/3 Nephroblastoma, NOS

- Wilms's tumor
- Nephroma, NOS

M8963/3 malignant rhabdoid tumor

- Rhabdoid sarcoma
- Rhabdoid tumor, NOS

M8964/3 Clear cell sarcoma of kidney

M8965/0 Nephrogenic adenofibroma

M8966/0 Renomedullary interstitial cell tumor

- Renomedullary fibroma

M8967/0 Ossifying renal tumor

M8970/3 Hepatoblastoma

- Embryonal hepatoma

M8971/3 Pancreatoblastoma

M8972/3 Pulmonary blastoma

- Pneumoblastoma

M8973/3 Pleuropulmonary blastoma

M8974/1 Sialoblastoma

M8980/3 Carcinosarcoma, NOS

M8981/3 Carcinosarcoma, embryonal

M8982/0 Myoepithelioma

- Myoepithelial tumor
- Myoepithelial adenoma

M8982/3 Malignant myoepithelioma

- Myoepithelial carcinoma

M8983/0 Adenomyoepithelioma

M8990/0 Mesencymoma, benign

M8990/1 Mesenchymoma, NOS

- Mixed mesenchymal tumor

M8990/3 Mesenchymoma, malignant

- Mixed mesenchymal sarcoma

M8991/3 Embryonal sarcoma

=== 9000–9030) Fibroepithelial Neoplasms ===
M9000/0 Brenner tumor, NOS

M9000/1 Brenner tumor, borderline malignancy

- Brenner tumor, proliferating

M9000/3 Brenner tumor, malignant

M9010/0 Fibroadenoma, NOS

M9011/0 Intracanalicular fibroadenoma

M9012/0 Pericanalicular fibroadenoma

M9013/0 Adenofibroma, NOS

- Cystadenofibroma, NOS
- Papillary adenofibroma

M9014/0 Serous adenofibroma, NOS

- Serous cystadenofibroma, NOS

M9014/1 Serous adenofibroma of borderline malignancy

- Serous cystadenofibroma of borderline malignancy

M9014/3 Serous adenocarcinofibroma

- Malignant serous adenofibroma
- Serous cystadenocarcinofibroma
- Malignant serous cystadenofibroma

M9015/0 Mucinous adenofibroma, NOS

- Mucinous cystadenofibroma, NOS

M9015/1 Mucinous adenofibroma of borderline malignancy

- Mucinous cystadenofibroma of borderline malignancy

M9015/3 Mucinous adenocarcinofibroma

- Malignant mucinous adenofibroma
- Mucinous cystadenocarcinofibroma
- Malignant mucinous cystadenofibroma

M9016/0 Gian fibroadenoma

M9020/0 Phyllodes tumor, benign

- Cystosarcoma phyllodes, benign

M9020/1 Phyllodes tumor, borderline

- Cystosarcoma phyllodes, NOS
- Phyllodes tumor, NOS

M9020/3 Phyllodes tumor, malignant

- Cystosarcoma phyllodes, malignant

M9030/0 Juvenile fibroadenoma

=== 904 Synovial-Like Neoplasms ===
M9040/0 Synovioma, benign

M9040/3 Synovial sarcoma, NOS

- Synovioma, NOS
- Synovioma, malignant

M9041/3 Synovial sarcoma, spindle cell

- Synovial sarcoma, monophasic fibrous

M9042/3 Synovial sarcoma, epithelioid cell

M9043/3 Synovial sarcoma, biphasic

M9044/3 Clear cell sarcoma, NOS (except of kidney M9864/3)

- Clear cell sarcoma, of tendons and aponeuroses
- Melanoma, malignant, of soft parts

=== 905 Mesothelial Neoplasms ===
M9050/0 Mesothelioma, benign

M9050/3 Mesothelioma, malignant or NOS

M9051/0 Fibrous mesothelioma, benign

M9051/3 Fibrous mesothelioma, malignant or NOS

- Spindled mesothelioma
- Sarcomatoid mesothelioma
- Desmoplastic mesothelioma

M9052/0 Epithelioid mesothelioma, benign

- Well differentiated papillary mesothelioma, benign
- mesothelial papilloma

M9052/3 Epithelioid mesothelioma, malignant or NOS

M9053/3 Mesothelioma, biphasic, malignant or NOS

M9054/0 Adenomatoid tumor, NOS

M9055/0 Multicystic mesothelioma, benign

- Cystic mesothelioma, benign

M9055/1 cystic mesothelioma, NOS

=== 906–909 Germ cell Neoplasms ===
M9060/3 Dysgerminoma

M9061/3 Seminoma, NOS

M9062/3 Seminoma, anaplastic

- Seminoma with high mitotic index

M9063/3 Spermatocytic seminoma

- Spermatocytoma

M9064/2 Intratubular malignant germ cells

- Intratubular germ cell neoplasia

M9064/3 Germinoma

- Germ cell tumor, NOS

M9065/3 Germ cell tumor, nonseminomatous

M9070/3 Embryonal carcinoma, NOS

- Embryonal adenocarcinoma

M9071/3 Yolk sac tumor

- Endodermal sinus tumor
- Polyvesicular vitelline tumor
- Orchioblastoma
- Embryonal carcinoma, infantile
- Hepatoid yolk sac tumor

M9072/3 Polyembryoma

- Embryonal carcinoma, polyembryonal type

M9073/1 Gonadoblastoma

- Gonocytoma

M9080/0 Teratoma, benign

- Adult cystic teratoma
- Adult/cystic teratoma, NOS
- Teratoma, differentiated
- Mature teratoma

M9080/1 Teratoma, NOS

- Solid teratoma

M9080/3 Teratoma, malignant, NOS

- Embryonal teratoma
- Teratoblastoma, malignant
- Immature teratoma, malignant or NOS

M9081/3 Teratocarcinoma

- Mixed embryonal carcinoma and teratoma

M9082/3 malignant teratoma, undifferentiated

- Malignant teratoma, anaplastic

M9083/3 Malignant teratoma, intermediate

M9084/0 Dermoid cyst, NOS

- Dermoid, NOS

M9084/3 Teratoma with malignant transformation

- Dermoid cyst with malignant transformation or with secondary tumor

M9085/3 mixed germ cell tumor

- Mixed teratoma and seminoma

M9090/0 Struma ovarii, NOS

M9090/3 Struma ovarii, malignant

M9091/1 Strumal carcinoid

- Struma ovarii and carcinoid

=== 910 Trophoblastic neoplasms ===
M9100/0 Hydatidifrom mole, NOS

- Hydatid mole
- Complete hydatidiform mole

M9100/1 Invasive hydatidiform mole

- Chorioadenoma /destruens
- Chorioadenoma
- Invasive mole, NOS
- Malignant hydatidiform mole

M9100/3 Choriocarcinoma, NOS

- Chorionepithelioma
- Chorioepithelioma

M9101/3 Choriocarcinoma combined with other germ cell elements

- combined with teratoma
- combined with embryonal carcinoma

M9102/3 Malignant teratoma, trophoblastic

M9103/0 Partial hydatidiform mole

M9104/1 Placental site trophoblastic tumor

M9105/3 Trophoblastic tumor, epithelioid

=== 911 Mesonephromas ===
M9110/0 Mesonephroma, benign

- Mesonephric adenoma
- Wolffian duct adenoma

M9110/1 Mesonephric tumor, NOS

- Wolffian duct tumor

M9110/3 Mesonephroma, malignant

- Mesonephric adenocarcinoma
- Mesonephroma, NOS
- Wolffian duct carcinoma

=== 912–916 Blood vessel tumors ===
M9120/0 Hemangioma, NOS

- Angioma, NOS
- Chorioangioma

M9120/3 Hemangiosarcoma

- Angiosarcoma

M9121/0 Cavernous hemangioma

M9122/0 Venous hemangioma

M9123/0 Racemose hemangioma

- Arteriovenous hemangioma

M9124/3 Kupffer cell sarcoma

M9125/0 Epithelioid hemangioma

- Histiocytoid hemangioma

M9130/0 Hemangioendothelioma, benign

M9130/1 Hemangioendothelioma, NOS

- Angioendothelioma
- Kaposiform hemangioendothelioma

M9130/3 Hemangioendothelioma, malignant

- Hemangioendothelial sarcoma

M9131/0 Capillary hemangioma

- Hemangioma simplex
- Infantile/plexiform/juvenile hemangioma

M9132/0 Intramuscular hemangioma

M9133/1 Epithelioid hemangioendothelioma, NOS

M9133/3 Epithelioid hemangioendothelioma, malignant

- Intravascular bronchial alveolar tumor

M9135/1 Endovascular papillary angioendothelioma

- Dabska tumor

M9136/1 Spindle cell hemangioendothelioma

- Spindle cell angioendothelioma

M9140/3 Kaposi's sarcoma

- Multiple hemorrhagic sarcoma

M9141/0 Angiokeratoma

M9142/0 Verrucous keratotic hemangioma

M9150/0 Hemangiopericytoma, benign

M9150/1 Hemangiopericytoma, NOS

- Hemangiopericytic meningioma

M9150/3 Hemangiopericytoma, malignant

M9160/0 angiofibroma, NOS

- Juvenile angiofibroma
- Fibrous papule of nose
- Involuting nevus
- Giant cell or cellular angiofibroma

M9161/0 Acquired tufted hemangioma

M9161/1 Hemangioblastoma

- Angioblastoma

M9150/0 Hemangiopericytoma, benign

M9150/1 Hemangiopericytoma, NOS

=== 917 Lymphatic vessel tumors ===
M9170/0 Lymphangioma, NOS

- Lymphangioendothelioma, NOS

M9170/3 Lymphangiosarcoma

- Lymphangioendothelial sarcoma
- Lymphangioendothelioma, malignant

M9171/0 Capillary lymphangioma

M9172/0 Cavernous lymphangioma

M9173/0 Cystic lymphangioma

- Hygroma, NOS
- Cystic Hygroma

M9174/0 Lymphangiomyoma

M9174/1 Lymphangiomyomatosis

- Lymphangioleiomyomatosis

M9175/0 Hemolymphangioma

=== 918–924 Osseous And Chondromatous neoplasms ===
M9180/0 Osteoma, NOS

M9180/3 Osteosarcoma, NOS

- Osteogenic sarcoma, NOS
- Osteochondrosarcoma
- Osteoblastic sarcoma

M9181/3 Chondroblastic osteosarcoma

M9182/3 Fibroblastic osteosarcoma

- Osteofibrosarcoma

M9183/3 Telangeictatic osteosarcoma

M9184/3 Osteosarcoma in Paget disease of bone

M9185/3 Small cell osteosarcoma

- Round cell osteosarcoma

M9186/3 Central osteosarcoma

- Conventional central osteosarcoma
- Medullary osteo sarcoma

M9187/3 Intraosseous well differentiated osteosarcoma

- Intraosseous low grade osteosarcoma

M9191/0 Osteoid osteoma, NOS

M9192/3 Parosteal osteosarcoma

- Juxtacortical osteosarcoma

M9193/3 Periosteal osteosarcoma

M9194/3 High grade surface osteosarcoma

M9195/3 Intracortical osteosarcoma

M9200/0 Osteoblastmoa, NOS

- Giant osteoid osteoma

M9200/1 Aggressive osteoblastoma

M9210/0 Osteochondroma

- Cartilagionus exostosis
- Cartilaginous exostosis
- Ecchondroma

M9210/1 Osteochondromatosis, NOS

- Ecchondrosis

M9220/0 Chondroma, NOS

- Enchondroma

M9220/1 Condromatosis, NOS

M9220/3 Chondrosarcoma, NOS

- Fibrochondrosarcoma

M9221/0 Juxtacortical chondroma

- Periosteal chondroma

M9221/3 Juxtacortical chondrosarcoma

- Periosteal chondrosarcoma

M9230/0 Chondroblastoma, NOS

- Chondromatous giant cell tumor
- Codman tumor

M9230/3 Chondroblastoma, malignant

M9231/3 Myxoid chondrosarcoma

M9240/3 Mesenchymal chondrosarcoma

M9241/0 Chondromyxoid fibroma

M9242/3 Clear cell chondrosarcoma

M9243/3 Dedifferentiated chondrosarcoma

=== 925 Giant cell tumors ===
M9250/1 giant cell tumor of bone, NOS

- Osteoclastoma, NOS

M9250/3 Giant cell tumor of bone, malignant

- Osteoclastoma, malignant
- Giant cell sarcoma of bone

M9251/1 Giant cell tumor of soft parts, NOS

M9251/3 Malignant giant cell tumor of soft parts

M9252/0 Tenosynovial giant cell tumor

- Fibrous histiocytoma of tendon sheath
- Giant cell tumor of tendon sheath

M9252/3 Malignant tenosynovial giant cell tumor

- Giant cell tumor of tendon sheath, malignant

=== 926 Miscellaneous bone tumors (C40._, C41._) ===
M9260/3 Ewing's sarcoma/tumor

M9261/3 Adamantinoma of long bones

M9262/0 Ossifying fibroma

- Fibro-osteoma
- Osteofibroma

=== 927–934 Odontogenic tumors C41._) ===
M9270/0 Odontogenic tumor, benign

M9270/1 Odontogenic tumor, NOS

M9270/3 Odontogenic tumor, malignant

- Odontogenic carcinoma/sarcoma
- Primary intraosseous or ameloblastic carcinoma

M9271/0 Ameloblastic fibrodentinoma

- Dentinoma

M9272/0 Cementoma, NOS

- Periapical cemental dysplasia or cemento-osseus dysplasia

M9273/0 Cementoblastoma, benign

M9274/0 Cementifying fibroma

- Cemento-ossifying fibroma

M9275/0 Gigantiform cementoma

- Florid osseus dysplasia

M9280/0 Odontoma, NOS

M9281/0 Compound odontoma

M9282/0 Complex odontoma

M9290/0 Ameloblastic fibro-odontoma

- Fibroameloblastic odontoma

M9290/3 Ameloblastic odontosarcoma

- Ameloblastic fibrodentinosarcoma or fibro-odontosarcoma

M9300/0 Adenomatoid odontogenic tumor

- Adenomeloblastoma

M9301/0 Calcifying odontogenic cyst

M9302/0 Odontogenic ghost cell tumor

M9310/0 Ameloblastoma, NOS

- Adamantinoma, NOS (except of long bones M9261/3)

M9310/3 Ameloblastoma, malignant

- Adamantinoma, NOS (except of long bones M9261/3)

M9311/0 Odontoameloblastoma

M9312/0 Squamous odontogenic tumor

M9320/0 Odontogenic myxoma

- Odontogenic myxofibroma

M9321/0 Central odontogenic fibroma

- Odontogenic fibroma, NOS

M9322/0 Peripheral odontogenic fibroma

M9330/0 Ameloblastic fibroma

M9330/3 Ameloblastic fibrosarcoma

- Ameloblastic sarcoma
- Odontogenic fibrosarcoma

M9340/0 Calcifying epithelial odontogenic tumor

- Pindbord tumor

M9341/1 clear cell odontogenic tumor

M9342/3 Odontogenic carcinosarcoma

=== 935–937 Miscellaneous tumors ===
M9350/1 Craniopharyngioma

- Rathke pouch tumor

M9351/1 Craniopharyngioma, adamantinomatous

M9352/1 Craniopharyngioma, papillary

M9360/1 Pinealoma

M9361/1 Pineocytoma

M9362/3 Pineoblastoma

- Mixed pineal tumor
- Mixed pineocytoma-pineoblastoma
- Pineal parenchymal tumor of intermediate differentiation
- Transitional pineal tumor

M9363/0 Melanotic neuroectodermal tumor

- Retinal anlage tumor
- Melanoameloblastoma
- Melanotic progonoma

M9364/3 Peripheral neuroectodermal tumor

- Neuroectodermal tumor, NOS

Peripheral primitive neuroectodermal tumor, NOS (PPNET)

M9365/3 Askin Tumor

M9370/3 Chordoma, NOS

M9371/3 Chondroid chordoma

M9372/3 Dedifferentiated chorcoma

M9373/0 Parachordoma

=== 938–948 Gliomas ===
M9380/3 Glioma, malignant

- Glioma, NOS (except nasal glioma, not neoplastic)

M9381/3 Gliomatosis cerebri

M9382/3 Mixed glioma

- oligoastrocytoma
- Anaplastic oligoastrocytoma

M9383/1 Subepyndymoma

- Subependymal glioma
- Subependymal astrocytoma, NOS
- Mixed subendymoma-ependymoma

M9384/1 Subependymal giant cell astrocytoma

M9390/0 Choroid plexus papilloma, NOS

M9390/1 Atypical choroid plexus papilloma

M9390/3 Choroid plexus carcinoma

- Choroid plexus papilloma, anaplastic or malignant

M9391/3 Ependymoma, NOS

- Epithelial / cellular / clear cell / tanycytic ependymoma

M9392/3 Ependymoma, anaplastic

- Ependymoblastoma

M9393/3 Papillary ependymoma

M9394/1 Myxopapillary ependymoma

M9400/3 Astrocytoma, NOS

- Astrocytic glioma
- Astroglioma
- Diffuse astrocytoma
- Astrocytoma, low grade
- Diffuse astrocytoma, low grade
- Cystic astrocytoma

M9401/3 Astrocytoma, anaplastic

M9410/3 Protoplasmic astrocytoma

M9411/3 Gemistocytic astrocytoma

- Gemistocytoma

M9412/1 Desmoplastic infantile astrocytoma or ganglioglioma

M9413/0 dysembryoplastic neuroepithelial tumor

M9420/3 Fibrillary astrocytoma

- Fibrous astrocytoma

M9421/1 Pilocytic astrocytoma

- Piloid or Juvenile astrocytoma
- Spongioblastoma, NOS

M9423/3 Polar spongioblastoma

- Spongioblastoma polare
- Primitive polar spongioblastoma

M9424/3 Pleomorphic xanthoastrocytoma

M9430/3 Astroblastoma

M9440/3 Glioblastoma, NOS

- Glioblastoma multiforme
- Spongioblastoma multiforme

M9441/3 Giant cell glioblastoma

- Monstrocellular sarcoma

M9442/1 gliofibroma

M9442/3 gliosarcoma

- Glioblastoma with sarcomatous component

M9444/1 Chordoid glioma

- Chordoid glioma of third ventricle

M9450/3 Oligodendroglioma, NOS

M9451/3 Oligodendroglioma, anaplastic

M9460/3 Oligodendroblastoma

M9470/3 Medullablastoma, NOS

- Melanotic medulloblastoma

M9471/3 Desmoplastic nodular medulloblastoma

- Desmoplastic medulloblastoma
- Circumscribed arachnoidal cerebellar sarcoma

M9472/3 Medullomyoblastoma

M9473/3 Primitive neuroectodermal tumor, NOS

- PNET, NOS
- Central primitive neuroectodermal tumor, NOS (CPNET)
- Supratentorial PNET

M9474/3 large cell medulloblastoma

M9480/3 Cerebellar sarcoma, NOS

=== 949–952 Neuroepitheliomatous neoplasms ===
M9490/0 Ganglioneuroma

M9490/3 Ganglioneuroblastoma

M9491/0 Ganglioneuromatosis

M9492/0 Gangliocytoma

M9493/0 Dysplastic gangliocytoma of cerebellum (Lhermitte-Duclos)

M9500/3 Neuroblastoma, NOS

- Sympathicoblastoma
- Central neuroblastoma

M9501/0 Medulloepithelioma, benign

- Diktyoma, benign

M9501/3 Medulloepithelioma, NOS

- Diktyoma, malignant

M9502/0 Teratoid medulloepithelioma, benign

M9502/3 Teratoid medulloepithelioma

M9503/3 Neuroepithelioma, NOS

M9504/3 Spongioneuroblastoma

M9505/1 Ganglioglioma, NOS

M9505/3 Ganglioglioma, anaplastic

M9506/1 Central neurocytoma

- Neurocytoma
- Cerebellar liponeurocytoma
- Lipomatous medulloblastoma
- Neurolipocytoma
- Medullocytoma

M9507/0 Pacinian tumor

M9508/3 Atypical teratoid/rhabdoid tumor

M9510/0 Retinocytoma

M9510/3 Retinoblastoma, NOS

M9511/3 Retinoblastoma, differentiated

M9512/3 Retinoblastoma, undifferentiated

M9513/3 Retinoblastoma, diffuse

M9514/1 Retinoblastoma, spontaneously regressed

M9520/3 Olfactory neurogenic tumor

M9521/3 Olfactory neurocytoma

- Esthesioneurocytoma

M9522/3 Olfactory neuroblastoma

- Esthesioneuroblastoma

M9523/3 Olfactory neuroepithelioma

- Esthesio neuroepithelioma

=== 953 Meningiomas ===
M9530/0 Meningioma, NOS

- Microcystic
- Secretory
- Lymphoplasmacyte-rich
- Metaplastic

M9530/1 Meningiomatosis, NOS

- Diffuse
- Multiple meningiomas

M9530/3 Meningioma, malignant

- Anaplastic
- Leptomeningeal sarcoma
- Meningeal sarcoma
- Meningothelial sarcoma

M9531/0 Meningothelial meningioma

- Endotheliomatous meningioma
- Syncytial meningioma

M9532/0 Fibrous meningioma

- Fibroblastic meningioma

M9533/0 Psammomatous meningioma

M9534/0 Angiomatous meningioma

M9537/0 Transitional meningioma

M9538/1 Clear cell meningioma

- Chordoid

M9538/3 Papillary meningioma

- Rhabdoid

M9539/1 Atypical meningioma

M9539/3 Meningeal sarcomatosis

=== 954–957 Nerve sheath tumors ===
M9540/0 Neurofibroma, NOS

M9540/1 Neurofibromatosis, NOS

- Multiple neurofibromatosis
- Von Recklinghausen disease (except of bone)

M9540/3 Malignant peripheral nerve sheath tumor

- MPNST, NOS
- MPNST with glandular differentiation
- Epithelioid
- with mesenchymal differentiation
- Melanotic
- Melanotic psammomatous

M9541/0 Melanotic neurofibroma

M9550/0 Plexiform neurofibroma

- Plexiform neuroma

M9560/0 Neurilemoma, NOS

- Schwannoma, NOS
- Neurinoma
- Acoustic neuroma
- Pigmented or melanotic schwannoma
- Plexiform / cellular / degenerated / ancient / psammomatous

M9560/1 Neurinomatosis

M9561/3 Malignant peripheral nerve sheath tumor with rhabdomyoblastic differentiation

- MPNST with rhabdomyoblastic differentiation
- Triton tumor, malignant
- Malignant schwannoma with rhabdomyoblastic differentiation

M9562/0 Neurothekeoma

- Nerve sheath myxoma

M9570/0 Neuroma, NOS

M9571/0 Perineurioma, NOS

- Intraneural perineurioma
- Soft tissue perineurioma

M9571/3 Perineurioma, malignant

- Perineural MPNST

M9560/0 Schwannoma, NOS

M9560/0 Neurinoma

M9560/0 Acoustic neuroma

M9570/0 Neuroma, NOS

=== 958 Granular cell tumors and Alveolar soft part sarcoma ===
M9580/0 Granular cell tumor/myoblastoma, NOS

M9580/3 Granular cell tumor/myoblastoma, malignant

M9581/3 Alveolar soft part sarcoma

M9582/0 Granular cell tumor of the sellar region (C75.1)

=== 959 Malignant lymphoma, NOS, Or diffuse ===
M9590/3 Malignant Lymphoma, NOS

- Lymphoma, NOS
- Microglioma (C71._)

M9591/3 Malignant lymphoma, non-Hodgkin, NOS

- Non-Hodgkin's lymphoma, NOS
- B cell lymphoma, NOS
- Malignant lymphoma, non-cleaved cell, NOS
- Malignant lymphoma, diffuse, NOS
- Malignant lymphoma, lymphocytic, intermediate differentiation, nodular
- Malignant lymphoma, small cell, noncleaved, diffuse
- Malignant lymphoma, undifferentiated cell, non-Burkitt
- Malignant lymphoma, undifferentiated cell type, NOS
- Lymphosarcoma, NOS
- Lymphosarcoma, diffuse
- Reticulum cell sarcoma, NOS
- Reticulum cell sarcoma, diffuse
- Reticulosarcoma, NOS
- Reticulosarcoma, diffuse
- Malignant lymphoma, small cleaved cell, diffuse
- Malignant lymphoma, lymphocytic, poorly differentiated, diffuse
- Malignant lymphoma, small cleaved cell, NOS
- Malignant lymphoma, cleaved cell, NOS

M9596/3 Composite Hodgkin and non-Hodgkin lymphoma

=== 965–966 Hodgkin lymphoma ===
M9650/3 Hodgkin lymphoma, NOS

- Hodgkin's disease, NOS
- Malignant lymphoma, Hodgkin

M9651/3 Hodgkin lymphoma, lymphocyte rich

- Lymphocyte-rich classical Hodgkin lymphoma
- Hodgkin disease, lymphocyte predominance, NOS
- Hodgkin disease, lymphocytic-histiocytic predominance
- Hodgkin disease, lymphocyte predominance, diffuse

M9652/3 Mixed cellularity classical Hodgkin lymphoma, NOS

- Hodgkin lymphoma, mixed cellularity, NOS

M9653/3 Lymphocyte-depleted classical Hodgkin lymphoma, NOS

M9654/3 Hodgkin lymphoma, lymphocyte depletion, diffuse fibrosis

M9655/3 Hodgkin lymphoma, lymphocyte depletion, reticular

M9659/3 Nodular lymphocyte predominant Hodgkin lymphoma

- Hodgkin lymphoma, lymphocyte predominance, nodular
- Hodgkin paragranuloma, NOS
- Hodgkin paragranuloma, nodular

M9661/3 Hodgkin granuloma

M9662/3 Hodgkin sarcoma

M9663/3 Nodular sclerosis classical Hodgkin lymphoma

- Hodgkin lymphoma, nodular sclerosis, NOS

M9664/3 Hodgkin lymphoma, nodular sclerosis, cellular phase

- Classical Hodgkin lymphoma, nodular sclerosis, cellular phase

M9665/3 Hodgkin lymphoma, nodular sclerosis, grade 1

- Classical Hodgkin lymphoma, nodular sclerosis grade 1
- Hodgkin disease, nodular sclerosis, lymphocyte predominance
- Hodgkin disease, nodular sclerosis, mixed cellularity

M9667/3 Hodgkin lymphoma, nodular sclerosis, grade 2

- Classical Hodgkin lymphoma, nodular sclerosis, grade 2
- Hodgkin disease, nodular sclerosis, lymphocyte depletion
- Hodgkin disease, nodular sclerosis, syncytial variant

=== 967–969 Mature B-cell Lymphomas ===
M9670/3 Malignant lymphoma, small B lymphocytic, NOS (see also M9823/3)

- Small lymphocytic lymphoma
- Malignant lymphoma, small lymphocytic, NOS
- Malignant lymphoma, lymphocytic, well differentiated, diffuse
- Malignant lymphoma, lymphocytic, NOS
- Malignant lymphoma, lymphocytic, diffuse, NOS
- Malignant lymphoma, small cell, NOS
- Malignant lymphoma, small lymphocytic, diffuse
- Malignant lymphoma, small cell diffuse

M9671/3 Malignant lymphoma, lymphoplasmacytic (see also M9761/3)

- Lymphoplasmacytic lymphoma
- Malignant lymphoma, lymphoplasmacytoid
- Immunocytoma
- Malignant lymphoma, plasmacytoid
- Plasmacytic lymphoma

M9673/3 Mantle cell lymphoma

- Includes all variants: blastic, pleomorphic, small cell
- Mantle zone lymphoma
- Malignant zone lymphoma
- Malignant lymphoma, lymphocytic, intermediate differentiation, diffuse
- Malignant lymphoma, centrocytic
- Malignant lymphomatous polyposis

M9675/3 Malignant lymphoma, mixed small and large cell, diffuse (see also M9690/3)

- Malignant lymphoma, mixed lymphocytic-histiocytic, diffuse
- Malignant lymphoma, mixed cell type, diffuse
- Malignant lymphoma, centroblastic-centrocytic, NOS
- Malignant lymphoma, centroblastic-centrocytic, diffuse

M9678/3 Primary effusion lymphoma

M9679/3 Mediastinal large B-cell lymphoma (C38.3)

- Mediastinal (thymic) large cell lymphoma

M9680/3 Malignant lymphoma, large B-cell, diffuse, NOS

- Diffuse large B-cell lymphoma, NOS
- Malignant lymphoma, large cell, NOS
- Malignant lymphoma, large B-cell, NOS
- Malignant lymphoma, histiocytic, NOS
- Malignant lymphoma, histiocytic, diffuse
- Malignant lymphoma, large cell, cleaved and noncleaved
- Malignant lymphoma, large cell, diffuse, NOS
- Malignant lymphoma, large cleaved cell, NOS
- Malignant lymphoma, large cell, cleaved, NOS
- Malignant lymphoma, large cell, noncleaved, diffuse or NOS
- Malignant lymphoma, large B-cell, diffuse, centroblastic, NOS
- Malignant lymphoma, large B-cell, centroblastic, NOS or diffuse
- Intravascular large B-cell lymphoma
- Angioendotheliomatosis
- Angiotropic lymphoma
- T-cell rich large B-cell lymphoma
- Histiocyte-rich large B-cell lymphoma
- Anaplastic large B-cell lymphoma

M9684/3 Malignant lymphoma, large B-cell, diffuse, immunoblastic, NOS

- Malignant lymphoma, immunoblastic, NOS
- Immunoblastic sarcoma
- Malignant lymphoma, large cell, immunoblastic
- Plasmablastic lymphoma

M9687/3 Burkitt lymphoma, NOS (see also M9826/3)

- Includes all variants
- Malignant lymphoma, undifferentiated
- Malignant lymphoma, small noncleaved
- Burkitt-like lymphoma

M9689/3 Splenic marginal zone lymphoma

- Splenic marginal zone B-cell lymphoma
- Splenic lymphoma with villous lymphocytes

M9690/3 Follicular lymphoma, NOS (see also M9675/3)

- Malignant lymphoma, follicular/follicle center, NOS

M9691/3 Follicular lymphoma, grade 2

- Follicular lymphoma, small cleaved cell

M9698/3 Follicular lymphoma, grade 3

- Malignant lymphoma, large cell/centroblastic, follicular, NOS

M9699/3 Marginal zone B-cell lymphoma, NOS

- Marginal zone lymphoma, NOS
- Extranodal marginal zone B-cell lymphoma of mucosa-associated lymphoid tissue (MALT-lymphoma)
- BALT lymphoma
- SALT lymphoma
- Monocytoid b-cell lymphoma
- Nodal marginal zone lymphoma
- Nodal marginal zone B-cell lymphoma

=== 970–971 Mature T- and NK-cell Lymphomas ===
M9700/3 Mycosis fungoides

- Pagetoid reticulosis

M9701/3 Sezary syndrome

- Sezary disease

M9702/3 Mature T-cell lymphoma, NOS

- Peripheral T-cell lymphoma, NOS
- T-cell lymphoma, NOS
- Peripheral T-cell lymphoma, pleomorphic small/medium/large cell/T-zone lymphoma
- Lymphoepithelioid lymphoma
- Lennert lymphoma

M9705/3 Angioimmunoblastic T-cell lymphoma

- Peripheral T-cell lymphoma, AILD (Angioimmunoblastic lymphadenopathy with dysproteinemia)

M9708/3 Subcutaneous panniculitis-like T-cell lymphoma

M9709/3 Cutaneous T-cell lymphoma, NOS (C44._)

- Cutaneous lymphoma, NOS

M9714/3 Anaplastic large cell lymphoma, T cell and Null cell type

- Anaplastic large cell lymphoma, CD30+/NOS

M9716/3 Hepatosplenic (gamma-delta) cell lymphoma

- Hepatosplenic T-cell lymphoma

M9717/3 Intestinal T-cell lymphoma

- Enteropathy type T-cell lymphoma

M9718/3 Primary cutaneous CD 30+ T-cell lymphoproliferative disorder (C44._)

- Lymphomatoid papulosis
- Primary cutaneous anaplastic large cell lymphoma
- Primary cutaneous CD30+ large T-cell lymphoma

M9719/3 NK/T-cell lymphoma, nasal and nasal type

- Extranodal NK/T cell lymphoma, nasal type
- T/NK-cell lymphoma

=== 972 Precursor Cell Lymphoblastic Lymphoma ===
M9727/3 Precursor cell lymphoblastic lymphoma, NOS (see also M9835/3)

- Blastic NK cell lymphoma
- Malignant lymphoma, lymphoblastic, NOS

M9728/3 Precursor B-cell lymphoblastic Lymphoma (see also M9836/3)

M9729/3 Precursor T-cell lymphoblastic Lymphoma (see also M9837/3)

=== 973 Plasma cell tumors ===
M9731/3 Plasmacytoma, NOS

- Extramedullary plasmacytoma
- Solitary plasmacytoma of bone (C40._, C41._)
- Solitary myeloma
- Solitary plasmacytoma

M9732/3 Multiple myeloma (C42.1)

- Plasma cell myeloma
- Myeloma, NOS
- Myelomatosis

M9733/3 Plasma cell leukemia (C42.1)

- Plasmacytic leukemia

M9734/3 Plasmacytoma, extramedullary (not occurring in bone)

- Extraosseous plasmacytoma

=== 974 Mast cell Tumors ===
M9740/1 Mastocytoma, NOS or Extracutaneous mastocytoma

- Mast cell tumor, NOS

M9740/3 Mast cell sarcoma

- Malignant mast cell tumor
- Malignant mastocytoma

M9741/3 Malignant mastocytosis

- Systemic tissue mast cell disease
- Aggressive systemic mastocytosis or Systemic mastocytosis with associated clonal, hematological non-mast cell lineage disease

M9742/3 Mast cell leukemia (C42.1)

=== 975 Neoplasms of Histiocytes and Accessory Lymphoid Cells ===
M9750/3 Malignant histiocytosis

M9751/1 Langerhans cell histiocytosis, NOS

M9752/1 Langerhans cell histiocytosis, unifocal

- Langerhans cell granulomatosis, unifocal
- Langerhans cell histiocytosis, mono-ostotic
- Eosinophilic granuloma

M9753/1 Langerhans cell histiocytosis, multifocal

- Langerhans cell histiocytosis, poly-ostotic

M9754/3 Langerhans cell histiocytosis, disseminated

- Langerhans cell histiocytosis, generalized
- Letterer-Siwe disease
- Acute progressive histiocytosis X

M9755/3 Histiocytic sarcoma

- True histiocytic lymphoma

M9756/3 Langerhans cell sarcoma

M9757/3 Dendritic cell sarcoma, NOS

- Interdigitating dendritic cell sarcoma/tumor

M9758/3 Follicular dendritic cell sarcoma/tumor

=== 976 Immunoproliferative diseases ===
M9760/3 Immunoproliferative disease, NOS

M9761/3 Waldenstrom macroglobulinemia (C42.0) (see also M9671/3)

M9762/3 Heavy chain disease, NOS

- Alpha heavy chain disease
- Mu heavy chain disease
- Gamma heavy chain disease
- Franklin disease

M9764/3 Immunoproliferative small intestinal disease (C17._)

- Mediterranean lymphoma
- Primary small intestinal extranodal marginal zone lymphoma

M9765/1 Monoclonal gammopathy of undetermined significance

- MGUS
- Monoclonal gammopathy, NOS

(M9766/1) Angiocentric immunoproliferative lesion

- LYmphoid granulomatosis
- Lymphomatoid granulomatosis

M9767/1 Angioimmunoblastic lymphadenopathy

M9768/1 T-gamma lymphoproliferative disease

M9769/1 Immunoglobulin deposition disease

- Systemic light chain disease
- Primary amyloidosis

=== 980) Leukemias, NOS ===
M9800/3 Leukemia, NOS

M9801/3 Acute leukemia, NOS

- Blast cell leukemia
- Undifferentiated leukemia
- Stem cell leukemia

M9805/3 Acute biphenotypic leukemia

- Acute leukemia of ambiguous lineage
- Acute mixed lineage leukemia
- Acute bilineal leukemia

=== (982–983) Lymphoid leukemias (C42.1) ===
M9820/3 Lymphoid leukemia, NOS

- Lymphocytic leukemia, NOS
- Lymphatic leukemia, NOS

M9823/3 B-cell chronic lymphocytic leukemia/small lymphocytic lymphoma (see also M9670/3)

- Chronic lymphocytic leukemia, B-cell type (includes all variants of BCLL)
- Chronic lymphocytic leukemia
- Chronic lymphoid leukemia
- Chronic lymphatic leukemia

M9826/3 Burkitt cell Leukemia (see also M9687/3)

- Acute lymphoblastic leukemia, mature B-cell type

M9827/3 Adult T-cell leukemia/lymphoma (HTLV-1 positive) includes all variants

- Adult T-cell lymphoma/leukemia

M9831/1 T-cell large granular lymphocytic leukemia

- T-cell large granular lymphocytosis
- NK-cell large granular lymphocytic leukemia
- Large granular lymphocytosis, NOS

M9832/3 Prolymphocytic leukemia, NOS

M9833/3 B-cell prolymphocytic leukemia

M9834/3 T-cell prolymphocytic leukemia

M9835/3 Precursor cell lymphoblastic leukemia, NOS (see also M9727/3)

- Precursor cell lymphoblastic leukemia, not phenotyped
- Acute lymphoblastic leukemia, NOS (see also M9727/3)
- Acute lymphoblastic leukemia, precursor-cell type
- Acute lymphoblastic leukemia-lymphoma, NOS
- Acute lymphocytic leukemia
- Acute lymphoid leukemia
- Acute lymphatic leukemia
- Acute lymphoblastic leukemia, L2 type, NOS
- FAB L2

M9836/3 Precursor B lymphoblastic leukemia (see also M9728/3)

- Pro-B ALL
- Common precursor B ALL
- Pre-B ALL
- Pre-pre-B ALL
- Common ALL
- c-ALL

M9837/3 Precursor T lymphoblastic leukemia (see also M9729/3)

- Pro-T ALL
- Pre-T ALL
- Cortical T ALL
- Mature T ALL

=== 984–993 Myeloid Leukemias (C42.1) ===
(9840–9849) Erythroleukemias (FAB-M6)

M9840/3 Acute myeloid leukemia, M6 type

- Acute erythroid leukemia
- Erythroleukemia
- FAB M6
- AML M6
- Erythremic myelosis, NOS

(9850–9859) Lymphosarcoma cell leukemia (9860–9869) Myeloid (Granulocytic) Leukemias

M9860/3 Myeloid leukemia, NOS

- Non-lymphocytic leukemia, NOS
- Granulocytic leukemia, NOS
- Myelogenous leukemia, NOS
- Myelomonocytic leukemia, NOS
- Myelocytic leukemia, NOS
- Eosinophilic leukemia
- Monocytic leukemia, NOS

M9861/3 Acute myeloid leukemia, NOS (FAB or WHO type not specified (see also M9930/3)

- Acute myelogenous leukemia
- Acute non-lymphocytic leukemia
- Acute granulocytic leukemia
- Acute myelogenous leukemia
- Acute myelocytic leukemia

M9863/3 Chronic myeloid leukemia, NOS

- Chronic myelogenous leukemia, NOS
- Chronic granulocytic leukemia, NOS
- Chronic myelocytic leukemia, NOS

M9866/3 Acute promyelocytic leukemia t(15;17)(q22;q11–12) * Acute promyelocytic leukemia, PML/RAR-alpha

- Acute myeloid leukemia, t(15:17(q22;q11–12)
- Acute promyelocytic leukemia, NOS

FAB-M3 (includes all variants)

- Acute promyelocytic leukemia (AML with t(15;17)(q22;q12), PML-RARa and variants)

M9867/3) Acute myelomonocytic leukemia

- Acute myelomonocytic leukemia
- FAB-M4

M9870/3 Basophilic leukemia or Acute basophilic leukemia

M9871/3 Acute myeloid leukemia with abnormal marrow eosinophils (includes all variants)

- AML with inv(16)(p13q22) or t(16;16)(p13;q22), CBFb/MYH11 (FAB M4Eo)

M9872/3 Acute myeloid leukemia, minimally differentiated (FAB type M0)

- Acute myeloblastic leukemia]

M9873/3 Acute myeloid leukemia, without maturation (FAB type M1)

M9874/3 Acute myeloid leukemia, with maturation (FAB M2), NOS

M9875/3 Chronic myelogenous leukemia BCR/ABL positive

- Philadelphia chromosome (Ph1 positive)
- t(9;22)(q34;q11)
- Chronic granulocytic leukemia (BCR/ABL positive)/(Ph1 positive)/t(9;22)(q34;q11)

M9876/3 Atypical chronic myelogenous leukemia BCR/ABL negative

- Atypical chronic myeloid leukemia (BCR/ABL negative)/(Ph1 negative)

M9891/3 Acute monoblastic and monocytic leukemia

- Monoblastic leukemia, NOS
- FAB M5 (includes all variants)

M9895/3 Acute myeloid leukemia multilineage dysplasia

- AML with/without prior myelodysplastic syndrome

M9896/3 AML with t(8;21)(q22;q22), AML1/ETO

- FAB M2 with t(8;21)(q22;q22), AML1/ETO

M9897/3 AML with 11q23 (MLL) abnormalities

- AML, MLL

M9910/3 Acute megakaryoblastic leukemia, NOS

- Megakaryocytic leukemia
- (FAB-M7)

M9920/3 Acute myeloid leukemia and myelodysplastic syndrome, therapy related, NOS Therapy-related acute myeloid leukemia, alkylating agent/epipodophyllotoxin related

M9930/3 Chloroma or Myeloid sarcoma (see also M9861/3)

- Granulocytic sarcoma

M9931/3) Acute panmyelosis with myelofibrosis (C42.1)

- Acute panmyelosis, NOS
- Acute myelofibrosis
- Acute myelosclerosis, NOS

=== 994 Other Leukemias (C42.1) ===
M9940/3 Hairy cell leukemia (C42.1)

- Hairy cell leukemia variant
- Leukemic reticuloendotheliosis

M9945/3 Chronic myelomonocytic, leukemia, NOS

- Type 1
- Type 2

M9946/3 Juvenile myelomonocytic leukemia

M9948/3 Aggressive NK cell leukemia

=== 995–996 Chronic Myeloproliferative Disorders (C42.1) ===
M9950/3 Polycythemia vera

- Polycythemia rubra vera
- Proliferative polycythemia

M9960/1 Chronic Myeloproliferative disease, NOS

M9961/3 Myelosclerosis with myeloid metaplasia

- Chronic idiopathic myelofibrosis
- Myelofibrosis as a result of myeloproliferative disease
- Agnogenic myeloid metaplasia
- Megakaryocytic myelosclerosis
- Myelofibrosis with myeloid metaplasia

M9962/3 Essential thrombocytemia

- Idiopathic thrombocythemia
- Essential/idiopathic hemorrhagic thrombocythemia

M9963/3 Chronic neutrophilic leukemia

M9964/3 Chronic eosinophilic leukemia / hypereosinophilic syndrome

=== 997 Other Haematologic Disorders ===
M9970/1 Lymphoproliferative disease/disorder, NOS

- Post-transplant lymphoproliferative disorder, pleomorphic

M9975/3 Myeloproliferative disease, NOS

- Chronic Myeloproliferative disease, unclassifiable
- Myelodysplastic / myeloproliferative diseases, unclassifiable

=== 998 Myelodysplastic syndrome (C42.1) ===
M9980/3 Chronic myelomonocytic leukemia or Refractory anemia

M9982/3 Refractory anemia with ringed sideroblasts

- with sideroblasts

M9983/3 Refractory anemia with excess blasts

- RAEB
- RAEB I
- RAEB II

M9985/3 Refractory cytopenia with multilineage dysplasia

M9986/3 Myelodysplastic syndrome associated with isolated del(5q) chromosome abnormality

M9989/3 Myelodysplastic syndrome, NOS

== See also ==
- Medical classification
