= B-cell leukemia =

- Specialty: Hematology, oncology

A B-cell leukemia is any of several types of lymphoid leukemia which affect B cells.

Types include (with ICD-O code):

- 9823/3 – B-cell chronic lymphocytic leukemia/small lymphocytic lymphoma
- 9826/3 – Acute lymphoblastic leukemia, mature B-cell type
- 9833/3 – B-cell prolymphocytic leukemia
- 9835/3-9836/3 – Precursor B lymphoblastic leukemia
- 9940/3 – Hairy cell leukemia

== See also ==
- T-cell leukemia
- B-cell lymphoma
