= Lymphoid leukemia =

- Other names: Lymphocytic, lymphogenous, lymphoblastic leukemias
- Specialty: Oncology, hematology

Lymphoid leukemias are a group of leukemias affecting circulating lymphocytes, a type of white blood cell. The lymphocytic leukemias are closely related to lymphomas of the lymphocytes, to the point that some of them are unitary disease entities that can be called by either name (for example, adult T-cell leukemia/lymphoma). Such diseases are all lymphoproliferative disorders. Most lymphoid leukemias involve a particular subtype of lymphocytes, the B cells.

== Classification ==
Historically, they have been most commonly divided by the stage of maturation at which the clonal (neoplastic) lymphoid population stopped maturing:

- Acute lymphoblastic leukemia
- Chronic lymphocytic leukemia

However, the influential WHO Classification (published in 2001) emphasized a greater emphasis on cell lineage. To this end, lymphoid leukemias can also be divided by the type of cells affected:

- B-cell leukemia
- T-cell leukemia
- NK-cell leukemia

The most common type of lymphoid leukemia is B-cell chronic lymphocytic leukemia.

=== B-cell leukemias ===
B-cell leukemia describes several different types of lymphoid leukemia which affect B cells.

Comparison of most common B-cell leukemias	Incidence	Histopathology	Cell markers	Comments
B-cell chronic lymphocytic leukemia (ICD-O: 9823/3)	30% of all leukemias. Also 3 to 4% of lymphomas in adults	Small resting lymphocytes mixed with variable number of large activated cells. Lymph nodes are diffusely effaced	CD5, surface immunoglobulin	Occurs in older adults. Usually involves lymph nodes, bone marrow and spleen. Most patients have peripheral blood involvement. Indolent.
Precursor B-cell lymphoblastic leukemia (ICD-O: 9835/3-9836/3)	85% of acute leukemias in childhood, Less common in adults	Lymphoblasts with irregular nuclear contours, condensed chromatin, small nucleoli and scant cytoplasm without granules.	TdT, CD19	Usually presents as acute leukemia

Other types include (with ICD-O code):

- 9826/3 – Acute lymphoblastic leukemia, mature B-cell type
- 9833/3 – B-cell prolymphocytic leukemia
- 9940/3 – Hairy cell leukemia

=== T-cell leukemias ===
T-cell leukemia describes several different types of lymphoid leukemias which affect T cells.

The most common T-cell leukemia is precursor T-cell lymphoblastic leukemia. It causes 15% of acute leukemias in childhood, and also 40% of lymphomas in childhood. It is most common in adolescent males. Its morphology is identical to that of precursor B-cell lymphoblastic leukemia. Cell markers include TdT, CD2, CD7. It often presents as a mediastinal mass because of involvement of the thymus. It is highly associated with NOTCH1 mutations.

Other types include:

- Large granular lymphocytic leukemia
- Adult T-cell leukemia/lymphoma
- T-cell prolymphocytic leukemia

In practice, it can be hard to distinguish T-cell leukemia from T-cell lymphoma, and they are often grouped together.

=== NK cell leukemia ===
Aggressive NK-cell leukemia (ANKL) is a lymphoid leukemia that is a deficiency NK cells. Not very much is known about this disease due to its rarity, but it is highly aggressive. A majority of patients with NK cell leukemia die within a year of diagnosis, and for ANKL in particular, half of patients die within two months.

==== Diagnosis ====
The requirements for diagnosing ANKL are as follows:

1. Immature-looking NK cells
2. Certain immunophenotypes
3. Germline configuration genes: TCR-β and IgH
4. Restricted cytotoxicity

The T-cell receptor (TCR) is an important factor when ANKL is being diagnosed along with T-cell leukemia. The TCR gene transcripts are normally positive for ANKL. Current Research is attempting to find the causation of ANKL. So far, the researchers have concluded that lineage of the T-cell receptor gene does not predict the behavior of the disease.

==== Treatment ====
ANKL is treated similarly to most B-cell lymphomas. Anthracycline-containing chemotherapy regimens are commonly offered as the initial therapy. Some patients may receive a stem cell transplant.

Overall survival depends on the stage of the cancer when treatment is initiated, and on a composite of numerous risk factors. The median time from diagnosis to death is less than 1 year in patients overall. Patients diagnosed early and/or with fewer risk factors can sometimes enter complete remission and expect much longer survival.

== Diagnosis ==
Flow cytometry is a diagnostic tool in order to count/visualize the amount of lymphatic cells in the body. T cells, B cells and NK cells are nearly impossible to distinguish under a microscope, therefore one must use a flow cytometer to distinguish them.

== Treatment ==
=== Targeted therapy ===
Several molecular tumor profiling protocols have been initiated in Europe (e.g., MOSCATO-01, iTHER, and ESMART) to identify actionable lesions for targeted treatment in specific subgroups of patients.

=== NK cell therapy ===
Natural killer (NK) cell therapy is used in pediatrics for children with relapsed lymphoid leukemia. These patients normally have a resistance to chemotherapy, therefore, in order to continue on, must receive some other kind of therapy. In some cases, NK cell therapy is a choice.

NK cells are known for their ability to eradicate tumor cells without any prior sensitization to them. One problem when using NK cells in order to fight off lymphoid leukemia is the fact that it is hard to amount enough of them to be effective. One can receive donations of NK cells from parents or relatives through bone marrow transplants. There are also the issues of cost, purity and safety. Unfortunately, there is always the possibility of Graft vs host disease while transplanting bone marrow.

NK cell therapy is a possible treatment for many different cancers such as Malignant glioma.
