= TCL6 =

Non-coding RNA found in humans

Identifiers
- Aliases: TCL6, TNG1, TNG2, T-cell leukemia/lymphoma 6 (non-protein coding), T cell leukemia/lymphoma 6 (non-protein coding), T cell leukemia/lymphoma 6
- External IDs: OMIM: 604412; GeneCards: TCL6
Orthologs
Databases	NCBI: entry; OMA: entry
Species	Human	Mouse
Entrez	27004	n/a
Ensembl	ENSG00000187621	n/a
UniProt	n a	n/a
RefSeq (mRNA)	NM_012468; NM_014418; NM_020550; NM_020552; NM_020553 NM_020554	n/a
RefSeq (protein)	n/a	n/a
Location (UCSC)	n/a	n/a
PubMed search		n/a
- Wikidata
View/Edit Human

In molecular biology, T-cell leukemia/lymphoma 6 (non-protein coding), also known as TCL6, is a long non-coding RNA. It is expressed in T-cell leukemia with a t(14;14)(q11;q32.1) chromosome translocation in humans and in a mouse model. It is not expressed in normal T-cells. It may be involved in leukemogenesis.

== See also ==
- Long noncoding RNA
