= Topographical code =

In medicine, a topographical code (or topography code) is a code that indicates a specific location in the body.

== Examples ==
Only the first of these is a system dedicated only to topography. The others are more generalized systems that contain topographic axes.

- Nomina Anatomica (updated to Terminologia Anatomica)
- ICD-O
- SNOMED
- MeSH (the 'A' axis)

== See also ==
- Medical classification
