= Prolymphocytic leukemia =

- Specialty: Hematology, oncology

Prolymphocytic leukemia is divided into two types according to the kind of cell involved: B-cell prolymphocytic leukemia and T-cell prolymphocytic leukemia. It is usually classified as a kind of chronic lymphocytic leukemia.
