= Chondroid syringoma =

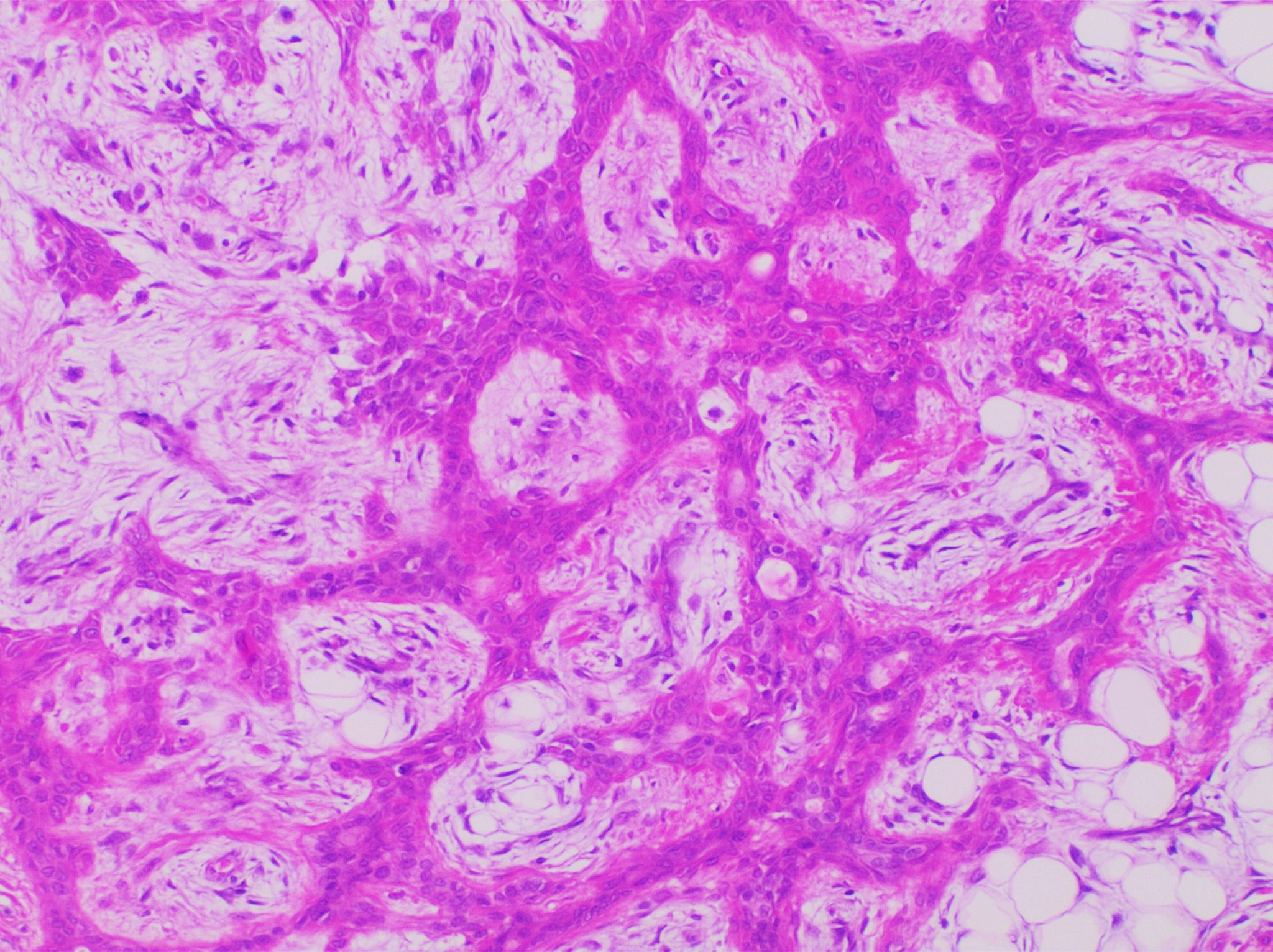
Histopathology of chondroid syringoma

A chondroid syringoma is a well circumscribed but unencapsulated, multilobulated sweat gland-derived tumor. It is centered in the deep dermis or subcutaneous fat. Microscopically it is a mixed tumor, characterized by prominent chondroid or myxoid stroma enveloping benign bland appearing epithelial and myoepithelial cells. Its malignant counterpart is malignant chondroid syringoma.
