= Prolymphocyte =

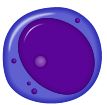
Prolymphocyte, schematic image

Prolymphocyte, micrograph in a peripheral blood smear. They are medium-sized lymphocytes with prominent nucleoli.

A prolymphocyte is a white blood cell with a certain state of cellular differentiation in lymphocytopoiesis. In the 20th century it was believed that a sequence of general maturation changed cells from lymphoblasts to prolymphocytes and then to lymphocytes (the lymphocytic series), with each being a precursor of the last. Today it is believed that the differentiation of cells in the lymphocyte line is not always simply chronologic but rather depends on antigen exposure, such that, for example, lymphocytes can become lymphoblasts.

The size is between 10 and 18 μm.

== See also ==
- Pluripotential hemopoietic stem cell
- Prolymphocytic leukemia
