= T-cell leukemia =

- Specialty: Immunology, oncology, angiology

T-cell leukemia describes several different types of lymphoid leukemia which affect T cells.

Types include:

- Large granular lymphocytic leukemia
- Adult T-cell leukemia/lymphoma
- T-cell prolymphocytic leukemia

In practice, it can be hard to distinguish T-cell leukemia from T-cell lymphoma, and they are often grouped together.
