= Refractory cytopenia with multilineage dysplasia =

- Specialty: Hematology

Refractory cytopenia with multilineage dysplasia is a form of myelodysplastic syndrome.

It is abbreviated "RCMD".
