= Intraneural perineurioma =

An intraneural perineurioma is a rare benign tumor within the sheath of a single nerve that grows but typically does not recur or metastasize. These lesions are only composed of perineurial cells, cloned from a single cell. They are distinct from schwannoma and neurofibroma.

Intraneural perineurioma is a neoplastic proliferation of perineurial cells with unique immunohistochemistry and ultrastructural features, and it is distinct from other onion bulb Schwann cell-derived entities. Despite harboring molecular abnormalities of the long arm of chromosome 22, intraneural perineurioma has not been associated with neurofibromatosis.

Due to the involvement of one or more nerve fascicles, intraneural perineuriomas are distinguished by a localized, solitary expansion of peripheral nerves. These tumors develop slowly or stay stable over time.
