= Malignant chondroid syringoma =

Type of skin cancer

- Other names: MCS, Malignant mixed tumor
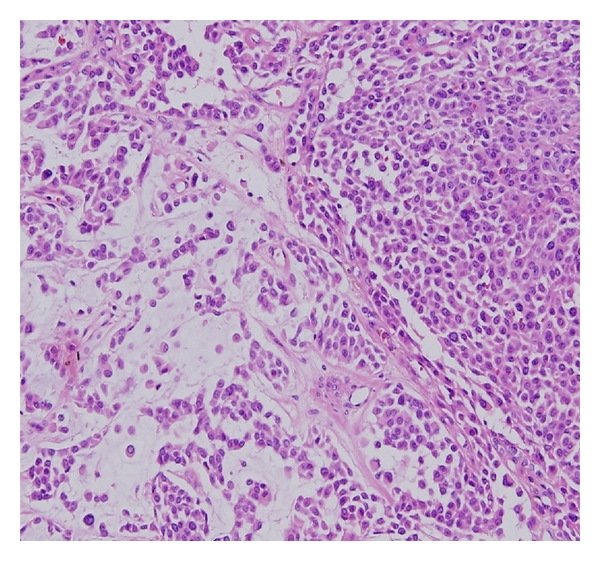
- Histopathological examination of malignant chondroid syringoma
- Causes: Prior physical injury, excessive mucoid matrix, chondroid syringoma less than three centimetres in size
- Diagnostic method: Clinical diagnosis needed
- Treatment: Excision, chemotherapy or radiotherapy is occasionally recommended

A malignant chondroid syringoma (also known as a "malignant mixed tumour" or "MCS" ) is a very uncommon cutaneous (skin) condition characterised by an adnexal eccrine tumour.

It is commonly reported to present on the trunk and extremities and behave in an aggressive manner. MCS is a cancerous subtype of its benign counterpart, chondroid syringoma, and is the least common variation that has an approximated prevalence of less than 0.005%. These tumours mainly arise "from sebaceous glands, sweat glands, and ectopic salivary glands" (Tural, Selçukbiricik, Günver, Karışmaz, and Serdengecti, 2013) and are rarely encountered in radiopathological and clinical practice. The tumours commonly appear with an asymptomatic "slow-growing, painless, solid subcutaneous or intradermal nodules with a normal margin" (Obaidat, Alsaad, and Ghazarian, 2007) and make up for less than one percent of all primary skin tumours. Commonly appearing in the limbs and body, these asymmetrical tumours range from two millimetres to more than three centimetres. MCS is one of the rarest subtypes of tumours and usually requires aggressive surgery to terminate. Despite accounting for only a small number of tumours recorded each year, malignant mixed tumours are easily confused with other skin conditions (such as epidermal cyst, pilar cyst, calcifying epithelioma, or a solitary trichoepithelioma (Tural, Selçukbiricik, Günver, Karışmaz, and Serdengecti, 2013)) and have high potential for recurrence after surgical excision. The aggressiveness of malignant chondroid syringoma varies, as 49% of cases have had local recurrence whereas some demonstrate regional lymph node or osseous metastasis. The rare neoplasms generally do not follow a determinate development path and are often difficult to diagnose.

Histologically, these malignant mixed tumours have epithelial and mesenchymal components and are very large, nodular, circumscribed, and nonulcerated. They are morphologically identical to pleomorphic adenoma and have a female predilection. They range from developing deep dermal to subcutaneous nodules and metastasise at a very high rate. Malignant mixed tumours can emerge "de nova or more rarely develop from a cartilaginous syringoma."(IADVL, 2004)

== Causes ==
Currently malignant mixed tumours do not have a definitive predisposing factor; however, prior physical injury has been proposed as a potential risk for the emergence of these tumours. Chondroid syringoma less than three centimetres are shown to have a heightened risk of malignancy. Other critical indicators include excessive mucoid matrix, – a connective tissue tumour with a myxoid background that is composed of "clear, mucoid substance – numerous mitoses, and poorly differentiated chondroid components." (Metzler, Schaumburg-Lever, Hornstein, and Rassner, 1996)

== Diagnosis ==
Diagnosing malignant mixed tumours is difficult as there many types of tumours and their variants. Malignant chondroid syringoma is particularly challenging to distinguish from other skin tumours as it is prone to the absence of definitive symptoms and an ambiguous clinical presentation. Some signs that help determine diagnosis of malignancy include: "mitosis, nuclear atypia, pleomorphism, lymphatic invasion, and local recurrence" (IADVL, 2004). Though it is usually found within women in the forties, the youngest-recorded case was fourteen years old and the oldest was eighty-six. The tumour is described as invasive and is clinically characterised by faster growth than the benign chondroid syringoma. They can generally be diagnosed when presenting "an epithelial component, eccrine or apocrine differentiation and myoepithelial component of fluctuating prominence" (IADVL, 2004). Diagnosis is recommended to follow microscopic analysis to ensure correct examination.

== Treatment ==
There currently is no established guideline for the standardised treatment of malignant chondroid syringomas, due to their rarity. However, the efficacy of treatment for malignant mixed tumours depends on the time of diagnosis. An immediate and broad surgical excision "with clear margins" (Tural, Selçukbiricik, Günver, Karışmaz, and Serdengecti, 2013) is considered curative and to be the most successful treatment. This treatment aims for the most efficacious disease control. It is largely agreed that chemotherapy and radiotherapy are ineffective yet are sometimes still recommended, yet radiotherapy reacts positively to skeletal metastasis. Combination chemotherapy for MCS is reported as unbeneficial. MCS is reported to have a high and continual risk of recurrence of metastasis, some patients experiencing metastasis nearly twenty years after the primary examination. Thus this necessitates consistent clinical follow-up in order to maintain a benign state of the tumour and achieve disease control.

== Prognosis ==
Malignant mixed tumours have a poor prognosis that is deemed unpredictable due to its spread being lymphatic or blood-borne. As there have only been a limited number of cases that have been reported, prognostic points are challenging to confirm, however mainly "include size, histological type, lymph node involvement, and distant metastasis" (Garcia, Atun, and Fernando, 2016). The outcome of the prognosis is dependent on early diagnosis and complete resection. The standard duration between diagnosis and reappearance was "23 months, 50 months, and 66 months for local recurrence, nodal metastasis, and distant metastasis, [respectively]" (Watarai, Amoh, Aki, Takasu, Katsuoka, 2011). In terms of prognosis regarding recorded patients, "27% of patients died from their disease."(Tural, Selçukbiricik, Günver, Karışmaz, and Serdengecti, 2013) As early as "nine weeks"( Malik, Saxena, and Kamath, 2013) succeeding clinical surgeries, had reports of patients' deaths been recorded. It has also been recorded that "one patient survived twelve years after their diagnosis."(Ka, Gnangnon, and Diouf, 2016) The tumour has a "60% rate of metastasis and mortality in the order of 25%" (Ka, Gnangnon, and Diouf, 2016) with the highest recordings of metastases being found in "lymph nodes and lung and less commonly, bone and brain." (Ka, Gnangnon, and Diouf, 2016)

== Recorded Cases ==
=== Facial localisation of a malignant chondroid syringoma ===
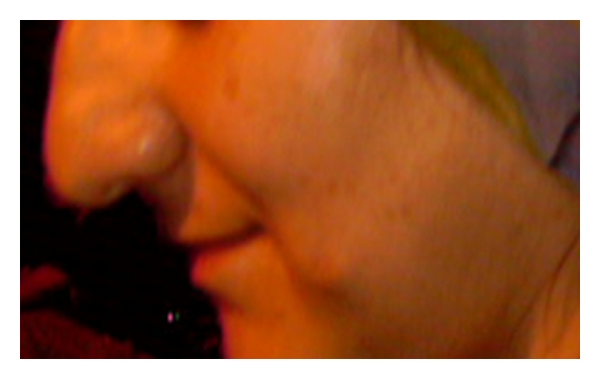
A 34-year-old female was admitted with a slowly growing nodular lesion at the left nasolabial region for three years. (Tural, Selçukbiricik, Günver, Karışmaz, and Serdengecti, 2013)

Written by Tural Selçukbiricik, Günver, Karışmaz, and Serdengecti, this report investigates the case of a slow growing bump on the face of a thirty-four-year-old woman. After undergoing an excisional biopsy, it was revealed that the nodule had developed into neurofibroma. Originally the patient had undergone excision however she sustained recurrence in under a year of the surgery. She continued to undergo excision and this led to the diagnosis of malignant chondroid syringoma. To remove the tumour, the patient first had a pathological and histopathological examination to examine the metastisation and growth pattern. According to Tural Selçukbiricik, Günver, Karışmaz, and Serdengecti, "the tumour had an expansive growing pattern and a few pleomorphic, atypical cells, and a rare mitotic activity."(Tural Selçukbiricik, Günver, Karışmaz, and Serdengecti, 2013) They also completed thoracic, abdominal, and cranial CT scans to determine the state of metastasis. The patient has a routine check-up of every three months to ensure no recurrence occurs and so far, has not had any relapse for two years following her procedure.

=== Malignant chondroid syringoma of the scalp ===
This 2013 case report by Malik, Saxena, and Kamath investigates the "large, fungating, and ulcerated growth"(Malik, Saxena, and Kamath, 2013) on the scalp of a sixty-one-year-old woman. The tumour was painless and developed gradually over nine months. An initial diagnosis determined the growth to be a squamous cell malignancy of the scalp. The patient was suggested to have a CECT scan of their head. The scan revealed dural invasion and a surgical excision with primary closure was performed. The histopathology findings revealed:

"small groups as well as scattered pleomorphic epithelial cells having hyperchromatic nuclei and scanty cytoplasm with one to two mitotic figures of high power field, surrounded by abundant basophilic chondromyxoid stroma, diagnostic of malignant CS."

The woman died two days after her operation after yielding a "high-grade fever and altered sensorium."(Malik, Saxena, and Kamath, 2013)

=== Multifocal and recurrent malignant chondroid syringoma ===
This report follows the development of MCS on a sixty-four-year-old male patient. The masses were described as skin lesions that had developed in a nodular fashion on the patient's right arm. To remove the growths, the patient underwent may surgical procedures where the nodules were effectively excised. The growth was described as a:

"ten centimetre, firm, lobulated mass with skin ulceration and muscle involvement was removed. Microscopic examination revealed infiltrating nests of medium to large epithelial cells embedded in a chondromyxoid matrix with few scattered plasmacytoid myoepithelial cells. There was brisk mitosis as well as large areas of tumour necrosis. All auxiliary lymph nodes were negative for tumour." (Garcia, Atun, and Fernando, 2016)

From this information, Garcia, Atun, and Fernando diagnosed the patient with malignant chondroid syringoma. After the surgery, the patient developed further growths on the scalp, face, body, upper right arm, and right foot. He was recommended chemotherapy however died before treatment began.

=== Lymph node metastasis after excision ===
This journal, written by Watarai, Amoh, Aki, Takasu, and Katsuoka discusses a case of malignant chondroid syringoma on a forty-six-year-old man and the state his diagnosis 12 years after excision. Originally in 1996, the man observed an "asymptomatic, enlarging nodule" (Watarai, Amoh, Aki, Takasu, and Katsuoka, 2011) on the sole of his right foot and proceeded to undergo an initial biopsy where he was not diagnosed. Physically, the nodule was "solitary, dome-shaped, skin coloured, and firm," (Watarai, Amoh, Aki, Takasu, and Katsuoka, 2011) and was 30 mm x 30 mm. The tumour underwent excision utilising a three-millimetre margin. The nodule was then replaced with grafting of the transplanted skin. The findings were as follows.

"The surgical specimen showed a lobular proliferation of tumour cells with glandular differentiation associated with a few mitotic cells, embedded in a mucinous stroma. Immunohistochemistry showed that the majority of tumour cells were positive for PAS diastase, toluidine blue, cytokeratins (CAM5.2, CK7), S-100 protein and GCDFP-15."

Although some abnormal tumours cells were present, the recorded findings the man was diagnosed with chondroid syringoma. An ultrasound and radiography were performed and revealed no indication of metastasis. However, in 2008, the man observed inflammation in his right groin area. Another ultrasound revealed a new mass also measuring 30 mm x 30mm, which was then excised. Examination of this new tumour revealed more abnormal tumour cells compared to the first nodule of the sole of the foot. The original diagnosis was thus re-examined to be consisting of malignant chondroid syringoma cells. The patient was then treated with radiation. After eighteen months he presented no evidence of recurrence or further distant metastasis.

== History ==
Hirsch and Helwig gave malignant chondroid syringoma its name in 1961 in 'Chondroid Syringoma: Mixed Tumour of Skin, Salivary Gland Type.' "Atypical mixed tumours of the skin,"(Hirsch and Helwig, 1961) their term for tumours characterised by "histological stigma of malignancy, local invasion, and satellite tumour nodules without proven metastases" is employed even now. As of 2011, only 43 cases have been reported.

== Terminology ==
Malignant mixed tumours also go by other names including: "malignant mixed tumour of skin, cutaneous malignant mixed tumour, metastasising chondroid syringoma, and aggressive chondroid syringoma." (Ka, Gnangnon, and Diouf, 2016)

== See also ==
- List of cutaneous conditions
- Neoplasm
