= Adenoacanthoma =

- Specialty: Oncology
- Symptoms: Headaches - Nausea - Blurred vision - vomiting - seizures& personality change are usual symptoms of Adenoacanthoma.
- Causes: Though the case of the malignant tumor Adenoacanthoma has not been fully identifies it accompanies Endometriosis (a disease in which tissue similar to the lining of the uterus grows outside the uterus.)

Adenoacanthoma is malignancy of squamous cells that have differentiated from epithelial cells. It can be present in the endothelium of the uterus, mouth and large intestine.

== Treatment ==
If the tumor is well-defined, the treatment is often includes a hysterectomy and radiation treatment. Treatment may vary according to how far the tumor has spread.

== Prognosis ==
Prognosis is dependent upon the presence and abundance of glandular cells. Outcomes improve if the tumor is well-defined.

== Epidemiology ==
It is associated with hormone replacement therapy (estrogen). The risk is higher in white women than other ethnicities, incidence, prevalence, age distribution, and sex ratio.
