= Primary cutaneous CD30 positive anaplastic large cell lymphoma =

- Other names: Primary cutaneous anaplastic large cell lymphoma.
- Specialty: Dermatology

Primary cutaneous anaplastic large cell lymphoma belongs to the group of cutaneous processes that are CD30+ lymphoproliferative and are characterized by autoregressive, recurrent, single or multifocal ulcerating nodules. Single or localized nodules, papules, or plaques are present in the majority of patients. However, a patient may have more than one lesion in up to 20% of cases.

For patients with localized lesions, the recommended courses of treatment include radiation therapy, lesion removal, and/or low-dose methotrexate. Systemic polychemotherapy is indicated for the treatment of diseases that progress quickly or that are extracutaneous.

== Signs and symptoms ==
Primary cutaneous anaplastic large cell lymphoma typically manifests as multifocal, solitary, or grouped nodules on the upper limbs that last for three to four weeks.

== Causes ==
The cause is complex and multifaceted. Only a small proportion of patients have CD30+ cells in normal lymphoid tissue. These are the cells that are thought to be the precursors of systemic anaplastic large cell lymphoma. It is believed that CD30's interaction with its ligand, CD30L, mediates the disease's proliferative and anti-proliferative phases. The chemokine receptors CCR8 and CCR10, which are implicated in skin localization, are also assumed to mediate cutaneous presentation through their expression. Another theory is that Langerhans cell-mediated antigen presentation chronically activates T cells, leading to cutaneous T cell lymphomas.

== Diagnosis ==
Primary cutaneous anaplastic large cell lymphoma is characterized histologically by large, irregular polygonal cells distributed in sheets throughout the dermis and occasionally the subcutis.

== Treatment ==
Complete surgical resection and/or radiation therapy are used to treat primary cutaneous anaplastic large cell lymphoma as a single lesion; the majority of patients experience total remission. While radiation of the primary lesion and the surrounding lymph nodes has been advised for patients whose local lymph nodes are involved, adding radiation to surgical excision does not seem to improve localized disease.

== See also ==
- Lymphomatoid papulosis
- List of cutaneous conditions
