= Interdigitating dendritic cell sarcoma =

- Specialty: Oncology

Interdigitating dendritic cell sarcoma is a form of malignant histiocytosis affecting dendritic cells.

It can present in the spleen. It can also present in the duodenum.
