= Extracutaneous mastocytoma =

- Specialty: Oncology, dermatology

Extracutaneous mastocytoma presents with benign appearing mast cells occurring in sites other than the skin or bone marrow.

== See also ==
- Mastocytosis
- Skin lesion
