= B-cell prolymphocytic leukemia =

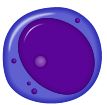
- Prolymphocyte
- Specialty: Hematology, oncology

B-cell prolymphocytic leukemia, referred to as B-PLL, is a rare blood cancer. It is a more aggressive, but still treatable, form of leukemia.

Specifically, B-PLL is a prolymphocytic leukemia (PLL) that affects prolymphocytes – immature forms of B-lymphocytes and T-lymphocytes – in the peripheral blood, bone marrow, and spleen. It is an aggressive cancer that presents poor response to treatment.

Mature lymphocytes are infection-fighting immune system cells. B-lymphocytes have two responsibilities:

1. Production of antibodies – In response to antigens, B-lymphocytes produce and release antibodies specific to foreign substances in order to aid in their identification and elimination phagocytes
2. Generation of memory cells – Interactions between antibodies and antigens allow B-lymphocytes to establish cellular memories, otherwise known as immunities that allow the body to respond more rapidly and efficiently to previously encountered species

== Classification ==
It is categorized as a lymphoproliferative disorder due to the excessive production of lymphocytes, in B-PLL there is excess production of B-prolymphocytes by the bone marrow. These immature lymphocytes are not normally found in the blood; part of their maturation process is being programmed to produce antibodies against foreign material prior to their departure from the bone marrow.

It has been suggested that some cases may represent a variant of mantle cell lymphoma.

B-PLL has been removed as an entity in the WHO-HAEM5 2022 classification. These patients will fit best either in ‘Prolymphocytic Progression of CLL’ or ‘Splenic B-Cell Lymphoma/Leukaemia with prominent nucleoli’, depending on the individual case. (source https://haembase.com/rare-leukaemias)

== Signs and symptoms ==
This type of leukemia is characterized by:

- More than 55% of circulating cells in peripheral blood (red blood cells, white blood cells and platelets collectively) are prolymphocytes. Generally, prolymphocyte proportion exceeds 90%
- Minimal or absence of lymphadenopathy – abnormalities in size, number or consistency of lymph nodes
- Splenomegaly - Abnormal enlargement of the spleen
- High white blood cell count
- B-symptoms – Fever, night sweats and/or weight loss

Similar to other leukemias, B-cell prolymphocytic leukemia is often asymptomatic. The most common signs and symptoms are the result of the inability of the bone marrow to produce normal levels of blood cells:

- Anaemia – due to lack of red blood cells
- More frequent, severe and prolonged infections – due to lack of normal white blood cells
- Bleeding and bruising – due to lack of platelets

== Diagnosis ==
Diagnosis of B-PLL is difficult due to its considerable overlap with other mature B-cell leukemias and lymphomas. It requires integration of morphology with diagnostic tests including immunophenotyping and chromosome analysis (cytogenetics).

=== Morphology ===
The malignant B cells are larger than average.

In order to diagnose a patient with B-PLL, b-prolymphocyte composition of a patient's blood cells must exceed 55%. High white blood cell counts – greater than 100 × 10^{9}/L – are also indicative of B-PLL. B-prolymphocytes are characterized by:

- Large size – approximately twice the size of a normal small lymphocyte
- Round or oval-shaped nuclei
- Single prominent nucleolus
- Moderately condensed nuclear chromatin
- High nuclear-cytoplasmic ratio – indicates more abundant cytoplasm

=== Immunophenotype ===
This technique is used to study proteins expressed in cells using immunologic markers. In B-PLL patients there is strong expression of surface immunoglobulin – a membrane-bound form of an antibody, b-lymphocyte surface antigens CD19, CD20, CD22, CD79a and FMC7, and weak expression of CD5 and CD23. Due to the similarities among lymphoproliferative disorders, it is often difficult to diagnose patients. Immunophenotyping helps distinguish B-PLL from similar diseases, one of its key identifiers is the absence in expression of the surface antigens CD10, CD11c, CD25, CD103 and cyclin D1 – an important regulator of cell-cycle progression.

A case has been described as CD20+, CD22+, and CD5-.

It can also be CD5+.

Another case was described as CD45+, CD19+, CD20+, CD5+, HLA-DR+, CD10-, CD23+/-, CD38+ and FMC7-.

=== Cytogenetics ===
B-PLL is rare, consequently few genetic studies have focused on this disease. As a result, the associated genetic lesions underlying B-PLL are largely unknown.

==== Chromosomal Mutations ====
The most commonly reported abnormalities have occurred at chromosome 14, specifically in a region of the chromosome called band q23 (14q23). Translocations to this location lead to overexpression of the cyclin D1 gene which has been linked to both the development and progression of a number of cancers. Other chromosomal abnormalities have been reported on 6q21, 11q23, 12p12, 13q14 and 17p.

It can involve deletions from chromosome 11 and chromosome 13.

==== TP53 Gene ====
Among the documented studies, mutations to the TP53 gene have occurred in 75% of all cases of B-PLL. This is the highest incidence among all sub-types of B-cell malignancies. Mutations to this gene have also been documented in other hematologic malignancies.

TP53 is an important transcriptional activator of genes involved in the regulation of the G1 checkpoint of the cell cycle as well as certain genes responsible for programmed-cell death (apoptosis). It is believed that mutations to TP53 are responsible for the frequent therapy resistance and aggressive course of this disease.

==== c-MYC Gene ====
In a small number of B-PLL cases, abnormalities in the c-MYC gene have been observed. It is considered a global amplifier and influences nearly all aspects of cellular activity. Among the number of genes it regulates, most are involved in cell growth, cell cycle progression, protein biosynthesis and apoptosis. Amplification of c-MYC has been reported in B-PLL patients and while the consequences are unclear, it is generally associated with poor clinical outcome.

=== Biopsy ===
After physicians have identified an abnormality in the composition of the peripheral blood, biopsies (tissue samples) from a patient's bone marrow and/or spleen are often recommended for confirmation. A bone marrow biopsy involves the removal of a small amount of tissue that is further analyzed for abnormalities, for B-PLL pathologists look for prolymphocytic infiltration where the hematopoietic stem cells of the bone marrow are replaced with prolymphocytes due to excess production. In 50% of reported cases, it was common for patients to be both anemic (lack healthy red blood cells in blood) and thrombocytopenic (deficiency of platelets in blood).

== Treatment ==
The rarity of B-PLL paired with its considerably fast progression compared to other leukemias has resulted in difficult production of effective treatments. This disease is currently incurable, treatments and therapy are guided to reduce prolymphocyte abundance in the blood and production by the bone marrow, treating symptoms and controlling progression.

=== Watchful Waiting ===
Some patients do not require immediate treatment after diagnosis; these patients include those that do not show overt symptoms or whose cancer has not been observed to be progressing. Regular check-ups with physicians are required to actively monitor the patient's condition; once there is evidence of disease progression or patient distress from symptoms, treatment will be implemented.

=== Chemotherapy ===
B-PLL has a very aggressive clinical course and refractoriness to chemotherapy; it is believed this resistance is the result of mutations to the TP53 gene. Its resistant nature has led to the use of combinations of chemotherapy drugs. Drug regimens recommended and employed by physicians are unique to each patient and are based on previous chemotherapy experience along with potential side effects. In addition to the utilization of combinations of chemotherapeutic drugs, it is most often paired with immunotherapy treatments.

=== Targeted Therapy ===
==== Monoclonal Antibodies ====
A type of targeted therapy that recognizes specific proteins in leukemia cells preventing collateral damage to normal, healthy cells. The following are compounds currently showing promising results in clinical trials and studies:

- Rituximab is a widely used monoclonal antibody in treating B-cell malignancies, it is directed against the surface protein CD20. Case studies have documented successful treatment of B-PLL solely with rituximab; additional studies have reported positive activity when rituximab is paired with the chemotherapeutic drugs fludarabine or bendamustine together with the anthracyclines mitoxantrone or epirubicin
- Alemtuzumab is a humanized antibody that targets the CD52 antigen which is highly expressed in malignant B-lymphocytes. In vitro tests have demonstrated that it induces cell death. Furthermore, it is most active in the blood, bone marrow and spleen, all of which are main sites involved with B-PLL and thus could serve as a potential agent in treating this disease with more research

==== Ibrutinib ====
Ibrutinib is a targeted therapy known as a Bruton's tyrosine kinase (BTK) inhibitor. It works by interfering with signaling pathways that promote the survival and proliferation of B-cells, including malignant B-cells in B-cell prolymphocytic leukemia (B-PLL). Recent observational studies have demonstrated that ibrutinib-containing regimens can be effective in treating B-cell prolymphocytic leukemia (B-PLL), specifically improving progression-free survival (PFS) and potentially overall survival (OS) compared to historical data for B-PLL.

=== Splenectomy or Radiation Therapy to Spleen ===
Patients with splenomegaly (enlarged spleen), unfit for systemic treatment or refractive to chemotherapy may have their spleens removed via splenectomy or undergo splenic irradiation in order to relieve pain, control their symptoms, and allow removal of a major proliferative focus and tumour bulk in this disease.

Splenic irradiation has been used in the treatment.

=== Stem Cell Transplantation ===
A stem cell transplant is a procedure that uses highly specialized cells called hematopoietic stem cells to replace bone marrow that contains the leukemia. This procedure should be considered in younger patients that have responded well to initial treatments because the progression and spread of this disease is inevitable. However, stem cell transplantation is a high-risk procedure, with significant morbidity and mortality rates. Furthermore, it is often not a feasible option due to the presence of other systemic diseases/conditions.

== Prognosis ==
Despite advancements in treatments and deeper understanding of pathogenesis, the prognosis for B-PLL patients is poor, with early relapse and median survival time between 3–5 years.

== Epidemiology ==
B-PLL represents less than 1% of all leukemia cases worldwide, mainly affecting the elderly population with a mean age of presentation between 65 and 70 years. Most cases have shown slight male predominance, with a male-to-female ratio of 1.6 to 1, and the vast majority of patients being Caucasians.
