= Precursor B-cell lymphoblastic leukemia =

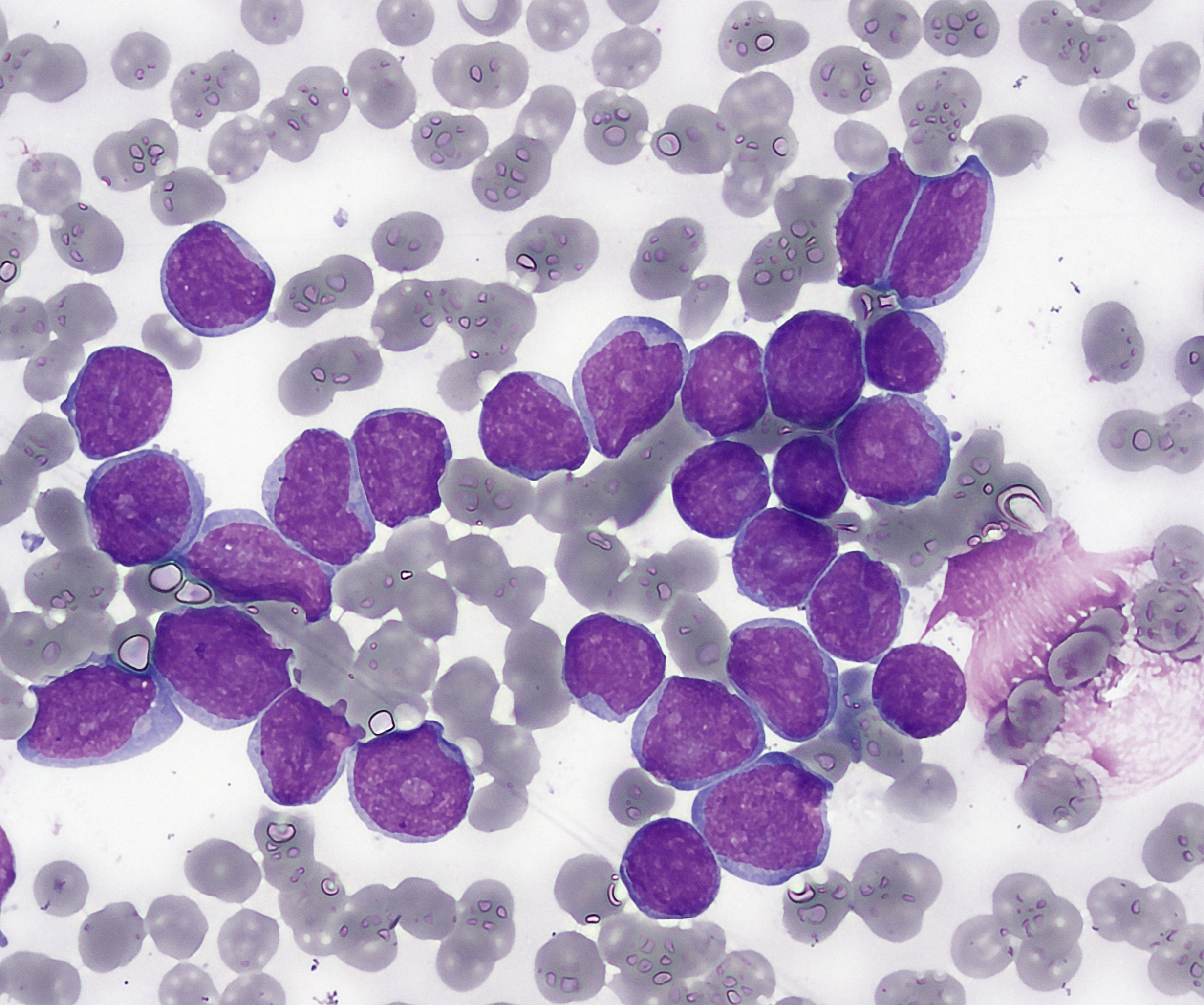
- A Wright's stained bone marrow aspirate smear from a person with precursor B-cell acute lymphoblastic leukemia.
- Specialty: Oncology

Precursor B-cell lymphoblastic leukemia is a form of lymphoid leukemia in which too many B-cell lymphoblasts (immature white blood cells) are found in the blood and bone marrow. It is the most common type of acute lymphoblastic leukemia (ALL). It is sometimes additionally classified as a lymphoma, as designated leukemia/lymphoma. ALL is the most prevalent childhood malignancy, with precursor B-cell ALL (B-ALL) accounting for approximately 75–80% of newly diagnosed pediatric ALL cases.

== Subtypes ==
It consists of the following subtypes:

- t(9;22)-BCR/ ABL
- t(v;11q23)-MLL rearrangement
- t(1;19)-E2A/PBX1
- t(12;21)-ETV/ CBFα
- t(17;19)-E2A-HLF

== Molecular mechanisms ==
One interesting model of precursor B ALL shows aberrant function of a single gene, namely Pax5, as capable to change phenotype of B cells toward precursor cells. In approximately two-thirds of pediatric B-ALL patients, specific chromosomal translocations and their fusion genes are detectable, and these fusion genes play crucial roles as risk factors for strategic treatment. More than 200 fusion genes or mutated genes have been identified in ALL patients to date.

== Diagnosis ==
t(12;21)-ETV/ CBFα has a better prognosis as compared to other subtypes.
