= T-cell prolymphocytic leukemia =

T-cell-prolymphocytic leukemia
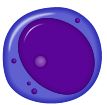
- Prolymphocyte
- Specialty: Hematology, oncology

T-cell-prolymphocytic leukemia (T-PLL) is a mature T-cell leukemia with aggressive behavior and predilection for blood, bone marrow, lymph nodes, liver, spleen, and skin involvement. T-PLL is a very rare leukemia, primarily affecting adults over the age of 30. It represents 2% of all small lymphocytic leukemias in adults. Other names include T-cell chronic lymphocytic leukemia, "knobby" type of T-cell leukemia, and T-prolymphocytic leukemia/T-cell lymphocytic leukemia.

== Signs and symptoms ==
People affected by T-cell prolymphocytic leukemia typically have systemic disease at presentation, including enlargement of the liver and spleen, widespread enlargement of the lymph nodes, and skin infiltrates.

Due to the systemic nature of this disease, leukemic cells can be found in peripheral blood, lymph nodes, bone marrow, spleen, liver, and skin. A high lymphocyte count (> 100 × 10^{9}/L) along with low amounts of red blood cells and platelets in the blood are common findings. HTLV-1 serologies are negative, and serum immunoglobins are within normal limits with no paraproteins present.

== Causes ==
It is postulated that the originating cell line for this disease is a mature (post-thymic) T-cell.

== Diagnosis ==
=== Morphology ===
In the peripheral blood, T-PLL consists of medium-sized lymphocytes with single nucleoli and basophilic cytoplasm with occasional blebs or projections. The nuclei are usually round to oval in shape, with occasional patients having cells with a more irregular nuclear outline that is similar to the cerebriform nuclear shape seen in Sézary syndrome. A small cell variant comprises 20% of all T-PLL cases, and the Sézary cell-like (cerebriform) variant is seen in 5% of cases.

Marrow involvement is typically diffuse with morphology similar to what is observed in peripheral blood. In the spleen, the leukemic cell infiltrate both the red pulp and white pulp, and lymph node involvement is typically diffuse through the paracortex. Skin infiltrates are seen in 20% of patients, and the infiltrates are usually dense and confined to the dermis and around the skin appendages.

=== Immunophenotype ===
T-PLL has the immunophenotype of a mature (post-thymic) T-lymphocyte, and the neoplastic cells are typically positive for pan-T antigens CD2, CD3, and CD7 and negative for TdT and CD1a. The immunophenotype CD4+/CD8- is present in 60% of cases, the CD4+/CD8+ immunophenotype is present in 25%, and the CD4-/CD8+ immunophenotype is present in 15% of cases.

=== Genetic findings ===
Clonal TCR gene rearrangements for the γ and δ chains are typically found. The most frequent chromosomal abnormality is the inversion of chromosome 14, specifically inv 14(q11;q32). This is found in 80% of cases, while 10% of cases show a reciprocal translocation of chromosome 14 (t(14;14)(q11;q32)).

Also, abnormalities of chromosome 8 are seen approximately 75% of patients, including idic (8p11), t(8;8)(p11-12;q12), and trisomy 8.

== Treatment ==
Most patients with T-cell prolymphocytic leukemia require immediate treatment.

T-cell prolymphocytic leukemia is difficult to treat, and it does not respond to most available chemotherapeutic drugs. Many different treatments have been attempted, with limited success in certain patients: purine analogues (pentostatin, fludarabine, cladribine), chlorambucil, and various forms of combination chemotherapy regimens, including cyclophosphamide, doxorubicin, vincristine, prednisone (CHOP), etoposide, bleomycin (VAPEC-B).

Alemtuzumab (Campath), an anti-CD52 monoclonal antibody that attacks white blood cells, has been used in treatment with greater success than previous options. In one study of previously treated people with T-PLL, people who had a complete response to alemtuzumab survived a median of 16 months after treatment.

Some patients who successfully respond to treatment also undergo stem cell transplantation to consolidate the response.

== Prognosis ==
T-PLL is an extremely rare aggressive disease, and patients are not expected to live normal life expectancies. Before the recent introduction of better treatments, such as alemtuzumab, the median survival time was 7.5 months after diagnosis. More recently, some patients have survived five years and more, although the median survival is still low.

== Epidemiology ==
About four men are diagnosed with this disease for every three women. Despite its overall rarity, it is also the most common type of mature T cell leukemia.
