= Primary testicular diffuse large B-cell lymphoma =

- Other names: PT-DLBCL; testicular diffuse large B-cell lymphoma; diffuse large B-cell lymphoma of the testes
- Specialty: Hematology; oncology
- Symptoms: enlarging testicular mass
- Complications: metastases, particularly to the central nervous system and uninvolved testicle
- Prognosis: guarded

Primary testicular diffuse large B-cell lymphoma (PT-DLBCL), also termed testicular diffuse large B-cell lymphoma and diffuse large B-cell lymphoma of the testes, is a variant of the diffuse large B-cell lymphomas (DLBCL). DLBCL are a large and diverse group of B-cell malignancies with the great majority (-85%) being typed as diffuse large B-cell lymphoma, not otherwise specified (DLBCL, NOS). PT-DLBCL is a variant of DLBCL, NOS that involves one or, in uncommon cases, both testicles. Other variants and subtypes of DLBCL may involve the testes by spreading to them from their primary sites of origin in other tissues. PT-DLBCL differs from these other DLBCL in that it begins in the testes and then may spread to other sites.

The B-cells in PT-DLBCL are malignant lymphocytes that normally function in the humoral immunity component of the adaptive immune system by secreting antibodies that, for example, bind to and neutralize invasive pathogens. In ~75% of PT-DLBCL cases these malignant B-cells are termed "activated B-cells" to distinguish them from "germinal center B-cells". While DLBCL may involve either type of B-cell, the various forms and subtypes of the DLBCL that involve activated B-cells are more aggressive and may require different therapies than those involving germinal center B-cells.

Lymphomas that begin in the testes, i.e. primary testicular lymphomas (PTL), are rare forms of lymphoma that represent 1-2% of all non-Hodgkins lymphomas and 5% of all testicular malignancies. PT-DLBCL is by far the most common form of PTL, accounting for >85% all PTL cases. Other forms of PTL include testicular mantle cell lymphoma, extranodal marginal zone B cell lymphoma, extranodal NK/T-cell lymphoma, nasal type, peripheral T-cell lymphoma, activin receptor-like kinase-1–negative anaplastic large cell lymphoma, and pediatric-type follicular lymphoma. Some European investigators have combined PT-DLBCL and most of the latter lymphomas into a lymphoma group termed "non-Hodgkin's primitive lymphoma of the testes".

All forms of PTL except the pediatric-type follicular lymphoma are highly aggressive malignancies PT-DLBCL is no exception to this rule: it begins in a testis, often spreads to the contralateral (i.e. uninvolved) testis as well as to the central nervous system and other sites, and commonly recurs following its treatment. In consequence, the disease has had a 5-year cause-specific survival of only ~60%. Addition of the immunotherapeutic drug, rituximab, to standard chemotherapy protocols has somewhat improved the treatment of most cases of this disease. In addition, clinical trials are testing new drugs for preventing relapses in, as well as treating, PT-DLBCL.

== Presentation ==
PT-DLBCL is by far the most common form of testicular cancer in men >60 years of age. It usually develops in this age group (median age ~65 years old, range 10–96 years) and presents as a painless testicular mass or swelling in one testis or, in ~6% of cases, both testes: PT-DLBCL is the most common testicular cancer to present with disease in both testicles. About 30-40% of afflicted individuals present concurrently with hydrocele testis, i.e. an enlarged testis due to the accumulation of clear fluid. The tumors commonly increase in size at a rapid pace, may advance locally to involve the epididymis, spermatic cord, scrotal skin, and/or regional lymph nodes, and may cause sharp scrotal pain. About 10% to 33% of individuals have B symptoms such as fever, night sweats, and weight loss. Initial laboratory studies show increases in serum lactate dehydrogenase levels in a third of cases. Some 80% of individuals present with either localized Ann Arbor stage I or locally advanced Ann Arbor stage II disease. The remaining ~20% of cases have disseminated Ann Arbor stage III or IV disease that has spread to the abdominal lymph nodes, Waldeyr's ring of lymphoid tissue that surrounds the nasopharynx and oropharynx, contralateral testis, skin, lung, and, most seriously, the parenchyma of and/or the leptomembranes surrounding either the brain or spinal cord.

== Pathophysiology ==
PT-DLBCL develops in an immune privileged site, the testis, which lies within the blood-testes barrier. Immune privileged sites are sanctuaries where abnormal antigens that occur in them, such as those that are expressed on cancer cells, do not evoke the development-suppressing and growth-suppressing actions of the immune surveillance system. Since PT-DLBCL often spreads from its origin in one testicle to other immune privileged sites such as the central nervous system and the contralateral testicle, the disease's development and/or progressive seems to depend on evading immune attack. Additionally, the neoplastic B-cells in this disease acquire abnormalities in their expression of certain genes that further allow them to escape immune responses. They have loss of function mutations in the beta-2 macroglobulin gene, B2M (~17% of cases); inactivating mutations in the NLR family CARD domain containing 5 gene, NLRC5 (10% of cases); and gains in the number of copies of DNA stretches in the long arms of chromosome 18 at position 13.1 and chromosome 12 at position 13,42 which lead to the overexpression of leukocyte immunoglobulin-like receptor subfamily A member 3 gene, LILRA3. These and possibly other unidentified gene abnormalities cause the complete lose of the expression of MHC class I and MHC class II proteins in >65% of all PT-DLBCL cases. MHC class I and II proteins are required for immune cells to identify and attack them. The neoplastic B cells in PT-DLBCL also show gains and amplifications of CD274 and PDCD1LG2, which are the genes for the pro-death ligands, PDL1 and PDL2, respectfully. Overexpression of these ligand proteins inhibits the immune responses of various cell types.

The neoplastic cells in PT-DLBCL have deletions in one or both copies of the CDKN2A gene which can lead to genome instability, i.e. a high rate of acquisition of other genetic abnormalities. These cells also have acquired mutations in: 1) the MYD88 gene (~83% of cases), PIM1 and/or PIM2 genes (~73% of cases), CARD11 gene (~16% of cases), TNFAIP3 gene (3-15% of cases), and NFKBIZ gene (~40% of cases), any one of which can lead to overaction of the NF-κB signaling pathway and thereby prolong cell survival; 2) the CD79B gene (~50% of cases) which can lead to overactivation of B-cell receptor signaling pathways and thereby stimulation of cellular proliferation and survival. 3) the genes for AKT1, AKT2, and PIK3CB, any one of which can lead to overactivation of the PI3K/AKT/mTOR signaling pathway and thereby excessive cellular proliferation and survival; 4) the MYC gene (~15% of cases) which can lead to increased cellular proliferation; and 5) the BCL2 gene (~10% of cases) which leads to prolonged cell survival.

These data suggest that in PT-DLBCL B-cells sequestered in an immune privileged testicular environment acquire a series of genetic abnormalities that promote their genetic instability (i.e. development of more genetic abnormalities), further escape the immune system, and dysregulate key signaling pathways that stimulate their proliferation, survival, and other pro-malignant behaviors. Some of these genetic abnormalities and dysregulated signaling pathways are potential targets for treating the disease.

== Diagnosis ==
The diagnosis of PT-DLBCL depends on examining the histology, i.e. microscopic anatomy, of biopsy samples taken from the tumors. Most of these tumors are large, e.g. ~6 centimeters, and show medium- to large-sized lymphoid tumor B-cells that resemble centroblasts diffusely infiltrating and effacing the architecture of the involved tissue. Non-malignant T-cell lymphocytes are interspersed with the malignant B-cells and when present in high numbers (i.e. >15% of nucleated cells) may be indicative of a more favorable prognosis. These neoplastic tumor cells express various B-cell marker proteins including CD19, CD20, CD22, and CD79a. They may also express CD10 (30-60% of cases), IRF4 (35-65% of cases), and nuclear BCL6 (60-90% of cases); ~80% of cases are "double expressers" of the protein products of the MYC and BCL2 genes, cMYC and Bcl-2, respectively. They are rapidly proliferating cells as determined by testing for Ki-67 staining. In at least seventy-five percent of cases, these malignant cells can be classified as being nongerminal center activated B-cell, i.e. ABC, rather than germinal center B-cell, i.e. GBC, variants of diffuse large B-cell lymphoma, not otherwise specified (see variants of DLBCL, NOS). Fluorescence in situ hybridization, DNA sequencing, and other gene analyses of these cells can be used to identify the gene-related abnormalities detailed in the above Pathophysiology section. Given the propensity of this tumor to spread beyond the testes and to relapse at extra-testicular sites (see following section), all patients should be examined for the stage of their disease. Generally, this staging should include positron emission tomography, computed tomography, or magnetic resonance imaging; lumbar puncture (i.e. spinal tap) with examination of the cerebral spinal fluid obtained from spinal taps for the presence of malignant B-cells; and in cases where these tests are negative, bone marrow examination for the presence of malignant B-cells.

== Treatment ==
PT-LBCL had been treated principally with the CHOP regimen used in most cases of DLBCL, NOS. This regimen consists of three chemotherapy drugs (cyclophosphamide, hydroxydoxorubicin, and oncovin) plus a glucocorticoid (either prednisone or prednisolone); it achieved complete remission rates of >50%, 5 year median overall and progression-free survival times of 49 and 96 months, respectively, and cause-specific survival rates at 5 years of ~60%. However, rates of disease recurrence on this regimen were high with central nervous system relapses occurring after 5 and 10 years in 20% and 35% of cases, respectively, and contralateral testicular relapses occurring after 10–15 years in 5-35% of cases. More recently, the immunotherapy drug, rituximab has been added to the CHOP chemotherapy regimen to form the R-CHOP chemoimmunotherapy regimen. Rituximab is a monoclonal antibody that binds to the CD20 protein on, e.g. B-cells, and by doing so targets these cells for attack by the hosts adaptive immune system. The addition of rituximab improved the therapeutic efficacy of the CHOP regimen in almost all forms of DLBCL but has been somewhat less successful in PT-DLBCL primarily because it does not cross the blood–brain barrier in appreciable amounts and therefore cannot treat or prevent central nervous system involvement. In consequence, current recommendations for PT-DLBCL include 1) the R-CHOP regimen; 2) systemic therapy with high dosage methotrexate, a drug which penetrates the blood–brain barrier or, in cases unable to tolerate high dose systemic methotrexate, intrathecal (i.e. injected directly into spinal fluid of the central nervous system) methotrexate; and 3) radiotherapy to the contralateral testis. For cases with central nervous system involvement at presentation, R-CHOP plus high dose intravenous and intrathecal methotrexate is recommended; for cases of lymphomatous meningitis R-CHOP plus cytarabine is recommended; and for cases in which patients have altered cardiac function and therefore unable to tolerate the cardiotoxic drug, hydroxydoxorubicin, R-CEOP (substitutes etoposide for hydroxydoxorubicin) is recommended.

== Research ==
Since it is not clear that methotrexate therapy reduces the incidence of central nervous system relapse in PT-DLBCL, a phase II non-comparative clinical study to determine the feasibility and toxicity of the R-CHOP regimen plus intrathecal liposomal cytarabine and systemic intermediate-dose methotrexate followed by loco-regional radiotherapy has just been completed. Results of this study, particularly as it relates to central nervous system involvement, are awaited. Other clinical studies seek to determine if ibrutinib (an inhibitor of B-cell receptor signaling that causes B-cell apoptosis, i.e. death) lenalidomide (mechanism of action is unclear), monoclonal antibodies (e.g. atezolizumab, durvalumab, or pembrolizumab) that inhibit the actions of PDLI), or drugs that inhibit the NF-κB or PI3K/AKT/mTOR signaling pathway (i.e. Copanlisib, ONC210, acalabrutinib, and TAK659), when added to the R-CHOP regimen, can prevent or treat central nervous system involvement in various forms of lymphoma and therefore might be useful in PT-DLBCL.
