= Aggressive lymphoma =

Aggressive Lymphoma
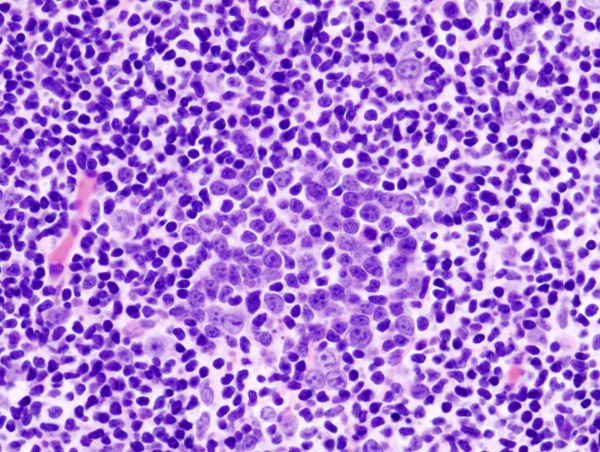
- Diffuse Large B-cell Lymphoma
- Specialty: Hematology and oncology

Aggressive lymphoma, also known as high-grade lymphoma, is a group of fast growing non-Hodgkin lymphoma.

There are several subtypes of aggressive lymphoma. These include AIDS-associated lymphoma, angioimmunoblastic lymphoma, Burkitt lymphoma, central nervous system (CNS) lymphoma, diffuse large B-cell lymphoma (DLBCL), mantle cell lymphoma (MCL) and peripheral T-cell lymphoma. Diffuse large B-cell lymphoma is the most common subtype as well as the most common type of non-Hodgkin lymphoma.

Aggressive lymphoma accounts for approximately 60 percent of all non-Hodgkin cases in the United States.

== Types ==
The most common types of high grade non-Hodgkin lymphoma are:

=== Diffuse large B-cell lymphoma ===
Diffuse large B-cell lymphoma (DLBCL) is a type of high-grade NHL which is the most common type of NHL worldwide at affecting 30–40 percent of all NHL cases. It is more prevalent in elderly patients with a median age of 70 years. Patients most often present with a rapidly growing tumor mass in single or multiple, nodal or extranodal sites. The most commonly diagnosed versions of DLBCL are germinal center B-cell like (GCB) and activated B-cell like (ABC) subtypes.

Immunohistochemical and flow cytometry analysis is also necessary for the diagnosis of this disease. The DLBCL cells have found to express B-cell antigens such as CD19, CD20, and CD22 as well as the transcription factors PAX5, BOB.1, and OCT2. CD20 is especially relevant in diagnostics as well as therapeutics because it is the target of the Rituximab humanized monoclonal antibody that is used in the most common treatment strategy.

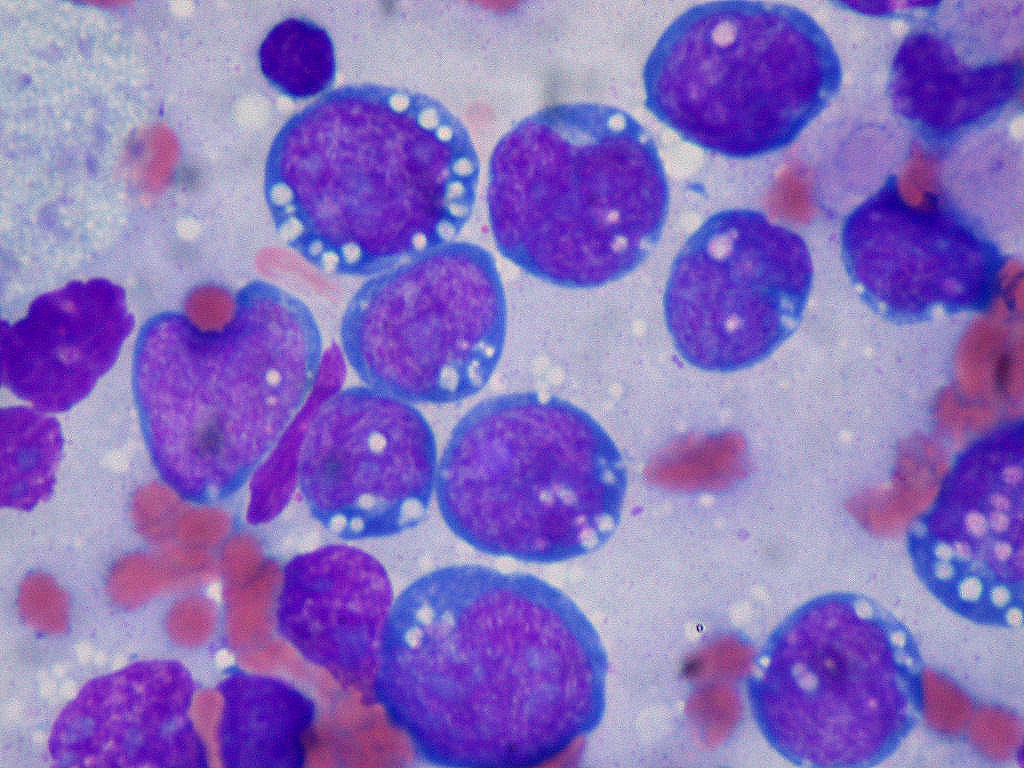
Burkitt lymphoma

=== Burkitt lymphoma ===
Burkitt lymphoma is named after the British surgeon Denis Burkitt. Burkitt identified this disease in 1956 in children in Africa.

Outside of Africa, Burkitt lymphoma is less common. In the U.S., about 1,200 people are diagnosed each year, and the disease disproportionately affects those younger than the age of 40. Burkitt lymphoma is especially likely to develop in people infected with HIV, the virus that causes AIDS. Before highly active antiretroviral therapy (HAART) became a widespread treatment for HIV/AIDS, the incidence of Burkitt lymphoma was estimated to be 1,000 times higher in HIV-positive people than in the general population.

=== Peripheral T-cell lymphoma ===
Peripheral T-cell lymphomas are less common accounting for approximately 7% of all non-Hodgkin lymphoma cases. It represents a diverse group of diseases that lacks clear definition. These diseases may involve extranodal sites such as the liver, bone, marrow, intestinal tract and the skin.

=== Rarer types of high grade non-Hodgkin lymphoma ===
- AIDS-associated lymphoma
- Angioimmunoblastic lymphoma
- Central nervous system (CNS) lymphoma
- Mantle cell lymphoma (MCL)

== Risk factors ==
Some of the risk factors that increase the risk factor of aggressive lymphoma include:

- Immunosuppressive medication used for organ transplant patients or autoimmune diseases.
- Infection with certain viruses and bacteria such as HIV and Epstein–Barr virus (EBV).
- Exposure to chemicals such as insecticides and pesticides.
- Older age.

== Diagnosis ==
The symptoms of aggressive lymphoma are similar to that of low-grade lymphomas. Patients may come in with painless swollen lymph nodes in their neck, armpits or groin. They can also describe symptoms such as abdominal pain, chest pain, persistent fatigue, fever, night sweats and unexplained weight loss depending on the stage of their tumor and its location.

== Treatment ==
For advanced diffuse large B-cell lymphoma the standard therapy for patients with DLBCL is the combination use of rituximab, cyclophosphamide, doxorubicin, vincristine, and prednisone (R-CHOP). While this commonly used regimen results in 60–70 percent of patients with DLBCL to be cured of disease there is also a group of patients that relapse and do not respond well to R-CHOP. For these patients the current treatment strategies are insufficient in treating their cancer. In addition to this, alternative treatments continue to be research due to the highly toxic nature of R-CHOP.

In contrast to mature B-cell neoplasms, therapeutic advances in peripheral T-cell lymphoma have generally lagged behind, particularly with regard to the introduction of immune therapies, which have impacted significantly and favorably on the prognosis of aggressive B cell lymphomas such as diffuse large B-cell lymphoma. As such, it remains a heterogeneous entity with a generally unfavorable prognosis.

== Prognosis ==
While there is no way of definitively predicting the outcome of an individual's diagnosis of aggressive lymphoma, there are ways of best guessing the prognosis of the patient. These prognostic factors can be divided into three categories. The first category depends on the patient and can be their age and overall health. The second category is dependent upon the tumor and includes the stage, tumor burden, and extranodal involvement. Finally, the last category is dependent on aggressiveness indicators. Factors such as LDH serum level and proliferative fraction can give insight into the tumor microenvironment and proliferation potential which may impact the prognosis.

== Research ==
Two promising immunotherapy approaches against diffuse large B-cell lymphoma are chimeric antigen receptor (CAR) T cell therapy and therapeutic blocking of programmed cell death protein 1 pathway (PD-1/PD-L1). While CAR T-cells have shown promising efficacy in patients with DLBCL, there have been some unexpected toxicity related issues that have come up for further research.

One proposal to improve research for treatment in aggressive lymphoma is to use canines as model animals. Canine lymphoma prevalence has been increasing over the years similar to the incidence of human lymphoma cases. Lymphoma represents the most frequent hematopoietic cancer in dogs with canine non-Hodgkin lymphoma (cNHL) having the highest incidence at 83% of all hematopoietic cancers. In addition to this diffuse large B-cell lymphoma is the most commonly seen subtype of NHL in both species. The advantages of using canines as model animals include spontaneous disease occurring without an isogenic background or genetic engineering; chronology of disease adapted to lifespan; shared environmental and societal status that allows dogs to be treated as "patients", while at the same time being able to ethically explore translational innovations that are not possible in human subjects; and organization of dogs into breeds with relatively homogeneous genetic backgrounds and distinct predisposition for lymphomas. In addition to this, there have also been studies that suggest that breed type might influence disease progression and response to therapy which is very promising for human therapeutic research.
