= International Prognostic Index =

Oncology tool to predict lymphoma prognosis

The International Prognostic Index (IPI) is a clinical tool developed by oncologists to aid in predicting the prognosis of patients with aggressive non-Hodgkin lymphoma. Previous to IPI's development, the primary consideration in assessing prognosis was the Ann Arbor stage alone, but this was increasingly found to be an inadequate means of predicting survival outcomes, and so other factors were studied.

== History ==
In 1984, the first prognostic indicator for advanced non-Hodkin lymphoma was developed. An information theory guided, computer search and evaluation procedure entropy minimax was employed to discover the largest sub-groupings for which survival is as extreme as possible. In the clinical trials analyzed retrospectively and containing a large fraction of patients not matching the 'good' - of 'good' (Karnofsky status >80 and 'A" Symptoms and SGOT <36 U/L), 'poor' (Karnofsky status <70 or Night sweats) and 'intermediate' (All Remaining) prognosis patterns identified, a significant difference was found between the survival of patients with and those without a complete response to therapy. The authors concluded that trials using a patient mix weighted toward good prognosis will not find such a difference.

In 1993, a retrospective analysis was performed on 2031 patients with aggressive non-Hodgkin lymphoma, of all ages, treated with a doxorubicin-based chemotherapy regimen such as CHOP between 1982 and 1987. Several patient characteristics were analyzed to determine whether they were associated with differences in survival, and the factors that emerged as significant were, in addition to the Ann Arbor stage: age, elevated serum lactate dehydrogenase (LDH), performance status, and number of extranodal sites of disease.

== International Prognostic Index ==
One point is assigned for each of the following risk factors:

- Age greater than 60 years
- Stage III or IV disease
- Elevated serum LDH
- ECOG/Zubrod performance status of 2, 3, or 4
- More than 1 extranodal site

The sum of the points allotted correlates with the following risk groups:

- Low risk (0-1 points) - 5-year survival of 73%
- Low-intermediate risk (2 points) - 5-year survival of 51%
- High-intermediate risk (3 points) - 5-year survival of 43%
- High risk (4-5 points) - 5-year survival of 26%

== Age-Adjusted IPI ==
A simplified index can be used when comparing patients within an age group (i.e. 60 or younger, or over 60) and includes only 3 of the above factors:

- Stage
- LDH
- Performance status

The sum of the points allotted correlates with the following risk groups:

- Low risk (0 points) - 5-year survival of 83%
- Low-intermediate risk (1 point) - 5-year survival of 69%
- High-intermediate risk (2 points) - 5-year survival of 46%
- High risk (3 points) - 5-year survival of 32%

Although the IPI has shown itself to be a useful clinical tool, widely used by oncologists and a mainstay of risk stratification in clinical trials for lymphoma, it should be kept in mind that it was developed prior to the use of rituximab, which is now included with anthracycline-based combination chemotherapy as of the standard of care in B-cell lymphomas (the majority of non-Hodgkin lymphomas). Rituximab has significantly improved the outcomes of lymphoma patients; and its effect on the prognostic value of the IPI is uncertain. Future development of a more rigorous prognostic index may thus be useful.

== Follicular Lymphoma International Prognostic Index (FLIPI) ==
Given the success of the IPI for intermediate grade lymphomas, an effort was undertaken to develop a similar prognostic index for the most common low-grade lymphoma, follicular lymphoma. The prognostic factors that emerged from this were: age, stage, number of lymph node areas involved, serum hemoglobin level, and serum LDH.

One point is assigned for each of the following adverse prognostic factors:

- Age greater than 60 years
- Stage III or IV disease
- Greater than 4 lymph node groups involved
- Serum hemoglobin less than 12 g/dL
- Elevated serum LDH

The sum of the points allotted correlates with the following risk groups:

- Low risk (0-1 points) - 5 and 10-year survivals of 91% and 71%, respectively
- Intermediate risk (2 points) - 5 and 10-year survivals of 78% and 51%, respectively
- High risk (3-5 points) - 5 and 10-year survivals of 53% and 36%, respectively

== Mantle Cell Lymphoma International Prognostic Index (MIPI) ==
An effort was more recently undertaken to identify a similar prognostic index predictive of outcome in advanced mantle cell lymphoma. There were four factors found to have independent prognostic relevance: age, performance status, LDH, and white blood cell count (WBC).

The point values are assigned as follows:

- 0 points: Age less than 50 years, ECOG performance status of 0–1, LDH less than 0.67 of the upper limit of normal, or WBC of less than 6,700 cells/mcl
- 1 point: Age 50–59, LDH 0.67-0.99 of the upper limit of normal, or WBC 6,700 to 9,999 cells/mcl
- 2 points: Age 60–69, ECOG performance status of 2–4, LDH 1-1.49 times the upper limit of normal, or WBC 10,000-14,000 cells/mcl
- 3 points: Age 70 or greater, LDH 1.5 times the upper limit of normal or greater, and WBC of 15,000 cells/mcl or greater

The sum of the allotted points correlates with the following risk groups:

- Low risk (0-3 points) - median survival not yet reached
- Intermediate risk (4-5 points) - median survival of 51 months
- High risk (6-11 points) - median survival of 29 months

== See also ==
- Hodgkin Lymphoma Prognosis
- Continuous Individualized Risk Index
