= Primary central nervous system lymphoma =

- Other names: Microglioma and Primary brain lymphoma
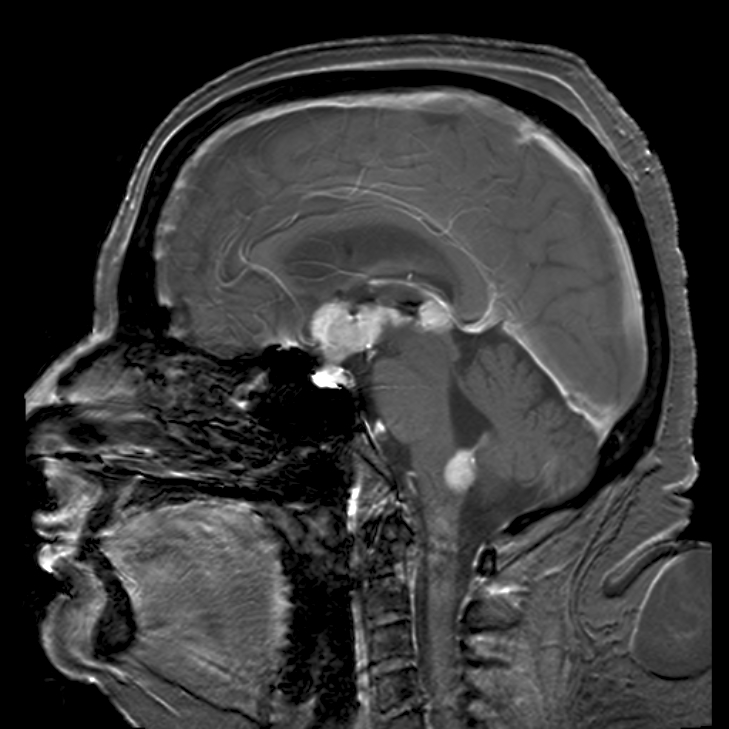
- Brain magnetic resonance imaging showing primary central nervous system B-cell non-Hodgkin lymphoma of the sella turcica and hypothalamus, continuing to the tectum (intensely white areas in the middle).
- Specialty: Hematology and Neuro-oncology

Primary central nervous system lymphoma (PCNSL), also termed primary diffuse large B-cell lymphoma of the central nervous system (DLBCL-CNS), is a primary intracranial tumor appearing mostly in patients with severe immunodeficiency (typically patients with AIDS). It is a subtype and one of the most aggressive of the diffuse large B-cell lymphomas.

PCNSLs represent around 20% of all cases of lymphomas in HIV infections. (Other types are Burkitt's lymphomas and immunoblastic lymphomas). Primary CNS lymphoma is highly associated with Epstein-Barr virus (EBV) infection (> 90%) in immunodeficient patients (such as those with AIDS and those immunosuppressed), and does not have a predilection for any particular age group. Mean CD4+ count at time of diagnosis is ~50/μL. In immunocompromised patients, prognosis is usually poor. In immunocompetent patients (that is, patients who do not have AIDS or some other acquired or secondary immunodeficiency), there is rarely an association with EBV infection or other DNA viruses. In the immunocompetent population, PCNSLs typically appear in older patients in their 50s and 60s.

Importantly, the incidence of PCNSL in the immunocompetent population has been reported to have increased more than 10-fold from 2.5 cases to 30 cases per 10 million population. The cause for the increase in incidence of this disease in the immunocompetent population is unknown.

== Signs and symptoms ==
A primary CNS lymphoma usually presents with seizure, headache, cranial nerve findings, altered mental status, or other focal neurological deficits typical of a mass effect. Systemic symptoms may include fever, night sweats, or weight loss. Other symptoms include

- diplopia
- dysphagia
- vertigo
- monocular vision loss
- progressive dementia or stupor in patients with a nonfocal neurologic exam and minimal abnormalities on MRI (more common in AIDS patients)
- facial hypoesthesia

== Diagnosis ==
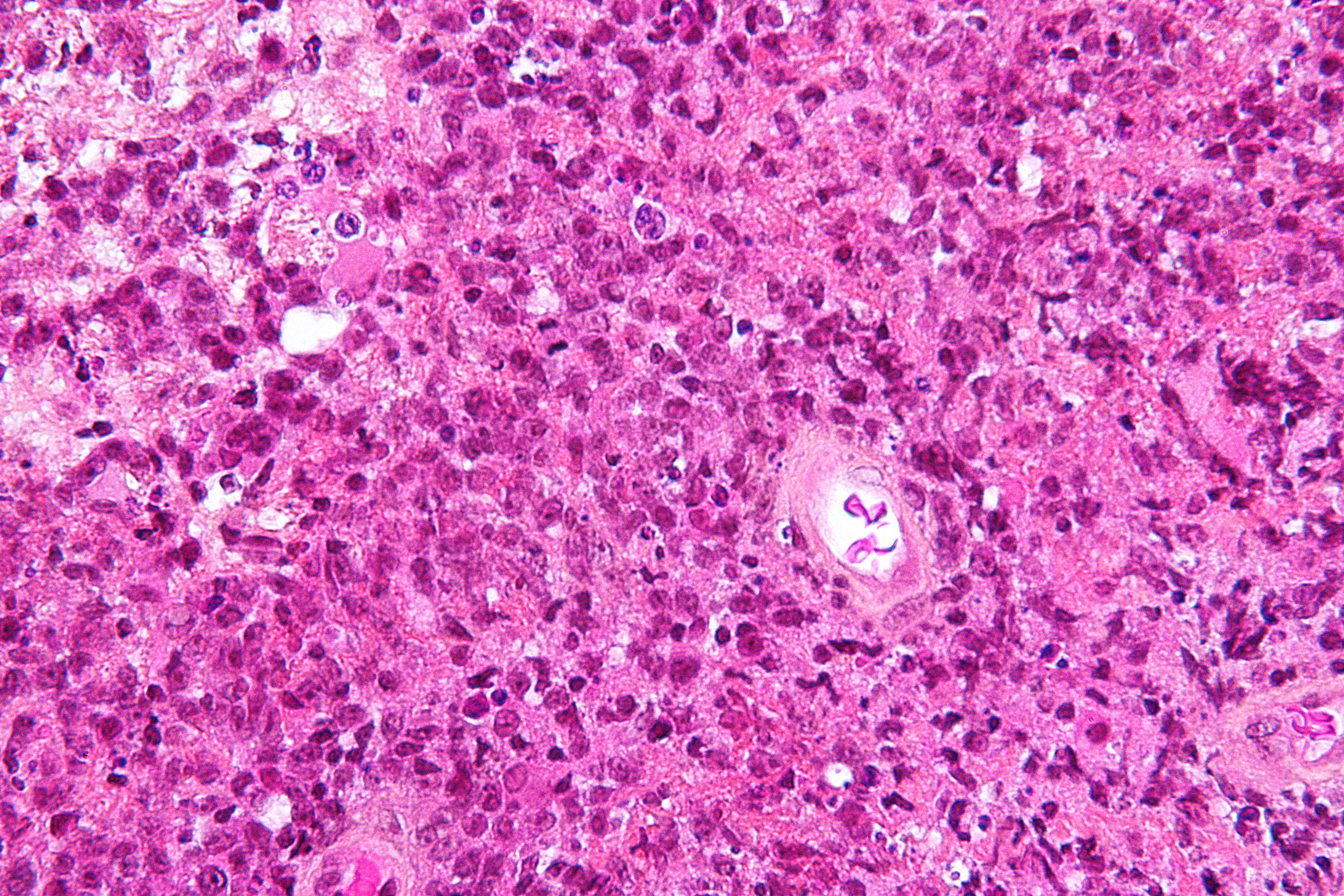
Micrograph showing a primary CNS lymphoma with the characteristic perivascular distribution composed of large cells with prominent nucleoli. Brain biopsy. HPS stain.

The current standard for diagnosis typically includes positive CSF cytology, vitreous biopsy, or brain/leptomeningeal biopsy. Histopathological confirmation is essential for definitive diagnosis.MRI or contrast enhanced CT classically shows multiple ring-enhancing lesions in the deep white matter. The major differential diagnosis (based on imaging) is cerebral toxoplasmosis, which is also prevalent in AIDS patients and also presents with a ring-enhanced lesion, although toxoplasmosis generally presents with more lesions and the contrast enhancement is typically more pronounced. Imaging techniques cannot distinguish the two conditions with certainty, and cannot exclude other diagnoses. Thus, patients undergo a brain biopsy or vitreous biopsy, if there is intraocular involvement. Another diagnostic challenge is distinguishing PCNSLs from high-grade gliomas. On MRI, PCNSLs typically show a more homogenous contrast enhancement whereas high-grade gliomas have a more heterogeneous contrast enhancement with necrotic area. However, a brain biopsy can be needed to distinguish between these two brain tumours.

=== Classification ===
Most PCNSLs are diffuse large B cell non-Hodgkin lymphomas.

== Treatment ==
Surgical resection is usually ineffective because of the depth of the tumour. Treatment with irradiation and corticosteroids often only produces a partial response and tumour recurs in more than 90% of patients. Median survival is 10 to 18 months in immunocompetent patients, and less in those with AIDS. The addition of IV methotrexate and folinic acid (leucovorin) may extend survival to a median of 3.5 years. If radiation is added to methotrexate, median survival time may increase beyond 4 years. However, radiation is not recommended in conjunction with methotrexate because of an increased risk of leukoencephalopathy and dementia in patients older than 60. In AIDS patients, perhaps the most important factor with respect to treatment is the use of highly active anti-retroviral therapy (HAART), which affects the CD4+ lymphocyte population and the level of immunosuppression. The optimal treatment plan for patients with PCNSL has not been determined. Combination chemotherapy and radiotherapy at least doubles survival time, but causes dementia and leukoencephalopathy in at least 50% of patients who undergo it. The most studied chemotherapeutic agent in PCNSL is methotrexate (a folate analogue that interferes with DNA repair). Methotrexate therapy in patients with PCNSL typically requires hospitalization for close monitoring and intravenous fluids. Leucovorin is often given for the duration of the therapy. Standard chemotherapeutic regimens for lymphoma such as CHOP are ineffective in PCNSL, probably due to poor penetration of the agents through the blood brain barrier.Newer treatments, such as high dose chemotherapy combined with autologous stem cell transplant are proving to increase survival by years. New research to increase permeability of the blood brain barrier with NGR-hTNF followed by CHOP, produced responses in 75% cases.A phase 1 clinical trial of ibrutinib – an inhibitor of Bruton's tyrosine kinase – in 13 patients reported responses in 10 (77%). Five of the responses were complete.

== Prognosis ==
=== In immunocompetent patients ===
The initial response to radiotherapy is often excellent, and may result in a complete remission. However, the duration of response with radiotherapy alone remains short, with median survival after treatment with radiotherapy just 18 months. Methotrexate based chemotherapy markedly improves survival, with some studies showing median survival after methotrexate chemotherapy reaching 48 months.

=== In AIDS patients ===
Patients with AIDS and PCNSL have a median survival of only 4 months with radiotherapy alone. Untreated, median survival is only 2.5 months, sometimes due to concurrent opportunistic infections rather than the lymphoma itself. Extended survival has been seen, however, in a subgroup of AIDS patients with CD4 counts of more than 200 and no concurrent opportunistic infections, who can tolerate aggressive therapy consisting of either methotrexate monotherapy or vincristine, procarbazine, or whole brain radiotherapy. These patients have a median survival of 10–18 months. Of course, highly active antiretroviral therapy (HAART) is critical for prolonged survival in any AIDS patient, so compliance with HAART may play a role in survival in patients with concurrent AIDS and PCNSL.
