= R-HDAC =

Chemotherapy regimen

R-HDAC, or R-HD-AraC (rituximab plus high-dose cytosine arabinoside) is a chemotherapy regimen that is used, alternating with R-Maxi-CHOP, as part of so-called "Nordic protocol" of treating mantle cell lymphoma. It consists of monoclonal antibody rituximab and high-dose antimetabolite cytarabine.

High-dose Ara-C (HDAC) without rituximab also has several other uses in oncohematology. For example, HDAC, alone or alternating with HD-MTX, is often used for primary CNS lymphoma and for treating CNS involvement in any lymphomas, and also for so-called "CNS prophylaxis" (prophylactic use in those forms of lymphoma which show no signs of CNS involvement at diagnosis but have high chance of CNS relapse or recurrence). HDAC is also used as a consolidation regimen in acute myeloid leukemia after initial 7+3 induction. HDAC also can be used as the primary induction therapy in AML, with higher than in 7+3 success (remission) rate, but it is more toxic and causes more treatment-related complications and treatment-related mortality than 7+3 when used as primary induction therapy.

== Dosing regimen ==
Drug	Dose	Mode	Days
Rituximab	375 mg/m^{2}	IV infusion	Day 1
High-dose Ara-Cytarabine	3000 mg/m^{2}	IV infusion	Days 1 and 2
