= Chemoimmunotherapy =

Chemotherapy combined with immunotherapy

Chemoimmunotherapy is chemotherapy combined with immunotherapy. Chemotherapy uses different drugs to kill or slow the growth of cancer cells; immunotherapy uses treatments to stimulate or restore the ability of the immune system to fight cancer. A common chemoimmunotherapy regimen is CHOP combined with rituximab (CHOP-R) for B-cell non-Hodgkin lymphomas.

Cancer treatment has progressed to combine different methods to improve the chances of survival. Surgery and radiation therapy are used to control cancer in specific areas, while systemic therapies (such as chemotherapy, endocrine therapy, targeted therapies, and bisphosphonates) are used to manage widespread cancer or cancer that has spread from its original site. Combining different therapies, including multiple drugs with complementary effects, has become common. This approach has been shown to improve five-year survival rates and delay the return of tumors.

== Chemotherapy ==
In the early 1900s, German chemist Paul Ehrlich began creating drugs for infectious diseases and introduced the term "chemotherapy" for using chemicals to treat illnesses. He was also the first to use animal models to test the effectiveness of these chemicals, significantly advancing cancer drug development. During World War II, the Cancer Chemotherapy National Service Center was set up to develop new drugs. Successes in treating acute childhood leukemia and advanced Hodgkin's disease led to increased screening for anti-tumor chemicals. It was discovered that combining different drugs improved treatment outcomes. Initially, the idea that chemicals could kill cancer cells and lead to cancer-specific therapies was not considered possible.

== Immunotherapy ==
James Allison, now at the University of Texas MD Anderson Cancer Center, was an early pioneer of immunotherapy. He discovered that CTLA-4 inhibits T cells from fully attacking, and hypothesized that blocking CTLA-4 could unleash the immune system to fight cancer. Initially, his idea was met with skepticism, but he continued his research and proved its validity in mice. Clinical trials later showed that anti-CTLA-4 antibodies could extend the lives of patients with metastatic melanoma by four months, and anti-PD-1 antibodies also demonstrated anti-tumor effects. Using the immune system to combat cancer has since gained popularity.

However, the interaction between tumors and the immune system creates multiple mechanisms of regulation and immune escape that suppress the immune response to tumors. Various immune cells, such as regulatory T cells (Tregs), T helper cells producing interleukin-17, myeloid-derived suppressor cells (MDSCs), and tumor-associated macrophages (TAMs), promote tumor growth and inhibit the immune response. Additionally, the tumor microenvironment further suppresses the anti-tumor immune response with high levels of suppressive cytokines (TGF-β, TNF, IL-10), expression of immune checkpoint molecules (PD-L1, B7-H4), and other alterations that help the tumor evade the immune system, such as the loss of tumor antigens necessary for antigen processing and presentation.

== Crosstalk between chemotherapy and immunotherapy ==
Chemotherapy is often seen as immunosuppressive because it suppresses immune cell production in the bone marrow in a dose-dependent manner. This suggests it might conflict with immunotherapy. However, research shows that certain chemotherapy drugs can, under specific conditions, boost the immune response against tumors and enhance the effectiveness of immunotherapy.

Chemotherapy can boost tumor immunity in two main ways: (a) by killing cancer cells through immunogenic cell death, and (b) by affecting both cancerous and normal cells in the tumor environment. Despite this, many chemotherapy treatments can also suppress the immune system by causing lymphopenia or impairing lymphocyte function. Integrating immune-based therapies with chemotherapy has the potential to alter the body's overall environment and the local tumor microenvironment, disrupting immune tolerance and suppression pathways.

== Clinical examples ==
There are several successful examples of the use of chemoimmunotherapy in treating cancer. For diffuse large B-cell lymphoma, the standard treatment includes cyclophosphamide, doxorubicin, vincristine, and prednisone (CHOP). Adding rituximab, a monoclonal antibody targeting the CD20 B-cell antigen, to the CHOP regimen has been shown to improve complete-response rates and extend event-free and overall survival in elderly patients without significantly increasing toxicity.

In metastatic breast cancer overexpressing HER2, chemoimmunotherapy also shows better results. The HER2 gene, which encodes the growth factor receptor HER2, is overexpressed in 25-30% of breast cancers, making tumors more aggressive. Trastuzumab, a monoclonal antibody against HER2, added to chemotherapy, has been proven in clinical trials to extend the time to disease progression, increase response rates, prolong response duration, reduce the death rate at 1 year, improve overall survival, and lower the risk of death by 20%. This demonstrates trastuzumab's significant benefit when combined with first-line chemotherapy for HER2-positive metastatic breast cancer.
