= Ifupinostat =

Clinical data
- Trade names: Betlin; 贝特琳
- Other names: BEBT-908

Legal status
- Legal status: Rx in China

Identifiers
- IUPAC name: N-Hydroxy-2-[methyl-[[2-[6-(methylamino)-3-pyridinyl]-4-morpholin-4-ylthieno[3,2-d]pyrimidin-6-yl]methyl]amino]pyrimidine-5-carboxamide
- CAS Number: 1235449-52-1
- PubChem CID: 59474330
- ChemSpider: 45743497
- UNII: DQ7TD3X4ZJ
- ChEMBL: ChEMBL5618885

Chemical and physical data
- Formula: C_{23}H_{25}N_{9}O_{3}S
- Molar mass: 507.57 g·mol^{−1}
- 3D model (JSmol): Interactive image
- SMILES: CNC1=NC=C(C=C1)C2=NC3=C(C(=N2)N4CCOCC4)SC(=C3)CN(C)C5=NC=C(C=N5)C(=O)NO
- InChI: InChI=InChI=1S/C23H25N9O3S/c1-24-18-4-3-14(10-25-18)20-28-17-9-16(36-19(17)21(29-20)32-5-7-35-8-6-32)13-31(2)23-26-11-15(12-27-23)22(33)30-34/h3-4,9-12,34H,5-8,13H2,1-2H3,(H,24,25)(H,30,33); Key:TWJZFXHSPBBPNI-UHFFFAOYSA-N

Ifupinostat (trade name Betlin) is a drug used for the treatment of cancer. It is approved in China for adults with relapsed or refractory diffuse large B-cell lymphoma who have received at least two lines of systemic therapy. It is being developed by BeBetter Med.

Ifupinostat acts as both a phosphoinositide 3-kinase α (PI3Kα) inhibitor and a histone deacetylase (HDAC) inhibitor.
