= Tafasitamab =

Pharmaceutical drug

Monoclonal antibody
- Type: Whole antibody
- Source: Humanized (from mouse)
- Target: CD19

Clinical data
- Trade names: Monjuvi, others
- Other names: MOR208, Xmab5574, tafasitamab-cxix
- AHFS/Drugs.com: Monograph
- License data: US DailyMed: Tafasitamab
- Pregnancy category: AU: C
- Routes of administration: Intravenous
- ATC code: L01FX12 (WHO)

Legal status
- Legal status: AU: S4 (Prescription only); CA: ℞-only / Schedule D; US: ℞-only; EU: Rx-only

Identifiers
- CAS Number: 1422527-84-1
- DrugBank: DB15044
- UNII: QQA9MLH692
- KEGG: D11601

Chemical and physical data
- Formula: C_{6550}H_{10092}N_{1724}O_{2048}S_{52}
- Molar mass: 147425.93 g·mol^{−1}

Tafasitamab, sold under the brand name Monjuvi, is an anti-cancer medication used in combination with lenalidomide for the treatment of adults with diffuse large B-cell lymphoma; or, when used in combination with lenalidomide and rituximab, for the treatment of follicular lymphoma. Tafasitamab is a humanized Fc-modified cytolytic CD19 antibody.

Tafasitamab may cause serious side effects including infusion related reactions, bone marrow suppression, infections, and harm to an unborn baby. The most common side effects of tafasitamab are low blood cell counts, fatigue, diarrhea, cough, fever, limb swelling, upper respiratory infection, and decreased appetite.

Tafasitamab was approved for medical use in the United States in July 2020, and in the European Union in August 2021. The US Food and Drug Administration (FDA) considers it to be a first-in-class medication.

== Medical uses ==
Tafasitamab, in combination with lenalidomide, is indicated for the treatment of adults with relapsed or refractory diffuse large B-cell lymphoma.

In the EU, tafasitamab (Minjuvi) is indicated in combination with lenalidomide followed by tafasitamab monotherapy for the treatment of adults with relapsed or refractory diffuse large B-cell lymphoma who are not eligible for autologous stem cell transplant.

In June 2025, the US Food and Drug Administration (FDA) expanded the indication for tafasitamab, in combination with lenalidomide and rituximab, for adults with relapsed or refractory follicular lymphoma.

== History ==
The US Food and Drug Administration (FDA) approved tafasitamab based primarily on evidence from one clinical trial (NCT02399085) of 81 participants 42 to 86 years old. Participants in the trial had lymphoma that relapsed or did not improve after prior treatments. The trial was conducted at 35 sites in the United States and Europe. At first, participants received tafasitamab in combination with lenalidomide and later tafasitamab alone following a specific schedule during each 28-day treatment cycle. Treatment continued until disease progression or unacceptable side effects. Both participants and health care providers knew which treatment had been given. The benefit of tafasitamab was evaluated by measuring how many participants had a complete or partial tumor shrinkage and how long that response lasted (called best overall response rate).

Efficacy for the treatment of follicular lymphoma was evaluated in inMIND, a double-blind, placebo-controlled trial (NCT04680052) randomizing 548 participants with relapsed or refractory follicular lymphoma to receive tafasitamab or placebo with lenalidomide and rituximab. Participants had received a median of one prior line of systemic therapy; 25% and 20% had two and three or more prior lines, respectively. The FDA granted the application for tafasitamab priority review and orphan drug designations for follicular lymphoma.

== Society and culture ==
=== Names ===
Tafasitamab is the international nonproprietary name (INN).

Tafasitamab is sold under the brand names Monjuvi and Minjuvi.
