= Continuous Individualized Risk Index =

Continuous Individualized Risk Index (CIRI) (initialism pronounced /ˈsɪri/) is to a set of probabilistic risk models utilizing Bayesian statistics for integrating diverse cancer biomarkers over time to produce a unified prediction of outcome risk, as originally described by Kurtz, Esfahani, et al. (2019) from Ash Alizadeh's laboratory at Stanford. Inspired by in game win probability models for predicting winners in sports and political elections, CIRI incorporates serial information obtained throughout a given patient's course to estimate a personalized estimate of various cancer-related risks over time. CIRI models have been developed available for various cancer types, including breast cancer (BRCA), diffuse large B-cell lymphoma (DLBCL), and chronic lymphocytic leukemia (CLL).The serial information integrated can be diverse, including choice of therapy and the associated responses observed, whether using liquid biopsies or radiological studies, pathological and other dynamic measurements.
