= Bendamustine =

Chemical compound

Clinical data
- Trade names: Treanda, others
- Other names: SDX-105
- AHFS/Drugs.com: Monograph
- MedlinePlus: a608034
- License data: US DailyMed: Treanda
- Routes of administration: Intravenous infusion
- ATC code: L01AA09 (WHO)

Legal status
- Legal status: AU: S4 (Prescription only); US: ℞-only

Pharmacokinetic data
- Bioavailability: NA (intravenous only)
- Protein binding: 94–96%
- Metabolism: Hydrolyzed to inactive metabolites. Two minor metabolites (M3 and M4) formed by CYP1A2
- Elimination half-life: 40 min (bendamustine), 3 h (M3), 30 min (M4)
- Excretion: ~50% urinary, ~25% fecal

Identifiers
- IUPAC name: 4-[5-[Bis(2-chloroethyl)amino]-1-methylbenzimidazol-2-yl]butanoic acid
- CAS Number: 16506-27-7
- PubChem CID: 65628
- IUPHAR/BPS: 7478
- DrugBank: DB06769
- ChemSpider: 59069
- UNII: 9266D9P3PQ
- ChEMBL: ChEMBL487253
- CompTox Dashboard (EPA): DTXSID2046888
- ECHA InfoCard: 100.205.789

Chemical and physical data
- Formula: C_{16}H_{21}Cl_{2}N_{3}O_{2}
- Molar mass: 358.26 g·mol^{−1}
- 3D model (JSmol): Interactive image
- SMILES: ClCCN(c2ccc1c(nc(n1C)CCCC(=O)O)c2)CCCl
- InChI: InChI=1S/C16H21Cl2N3O2/c1-20-14-6-5-12(21(9-7-17)10-8-18)11-13(14)19-15(20)3-2-4-16(22)23/h5-6,11H,2-4,7-10H2,1H3,(H,22,23); Key:YTKUWDBFDASYHO-UHFFFAOYSA-N

Bendamustine, sold under the brand name Treanda among others, is a chemotherapy medication used in the treatment of chronic lymphocytic leukemia (CLL), multiple myeloma, and non-Hodgkin's lymphoma. It is given by injection into a vein.

Common side effects include low blood cell counts, fever, nausea, diarrhea, loss of appetite, cough, and rash. Other severe side effects include allergic reactions and increased risk of infection. Use in pregnancy is known to harm the baby. Bendamustine is in the alkylating agents drug class. It works by interfering with the function of DNA and RNA.

Bendamustine was approved for medical use in the United States in 2008. It is on the World Health Organization's List of Essential Medicines. It was originally made from nitrogen mustard.

== Medical uses ==
One combination for stage III/IV relapsed or refractory indolent lymphomas and mantle cell lymphoma (MCL), with or without prior rituximab-containing chemoimmunotherapy treatment, is bendamustine with mitoxantrone and rituximab. In Germany in 2012 it has become the first line treatment of choice for indolent lymphoma. Trial results released in June 2012 showed that it more than doubled disease progression-free survival when given along with rituximab. The combination also left patients with fewer side effects than the older R-CHOP treatment.

== Adverse effects ==
Common adverse reactions are typical for the class of nitrogen mustards, and include nausea, fatigue, vomiting, diarrhea, fever, constipation, loss of appetite, cough, headache, unintentional weight loss, difficulty breathing, rashes, and stomatitis, as well as immunosuppression, anemia, and low platelet counts. Notably, this drug has a low incidence of hair loss (alopecia) unlike most other chemotherapy drugs.

== Pharmacology ==
Bendamustine is a white, water-soluble microcrystalline powder with amphoteric properties. It acts as an alkylating agent causing intra-strand and inter-strand cross-links between DNA bases.

After intravenous infusion, it is extensively metabolised in the liver by cytochrome p450. More than 95% of the drug is bound to protein – primarily albumin. Only free bendamustine is active. Elimination is biphasic, with a half-life of 6–10 minutes and a terminal half-life of approximately 30 minutes. It is eliminated primarily through the kidneys.

== History ==
Bendamustine was first made in 1963 by Ozegowski and Krebs in East Germany (the former German Democratic Republic). Until 1990 it was available only in East Germany. East German researchers found that it was useful for treating chronic lymphocytic leukemia, Hodgkin's disease, non-Hodgkin's lymphoma, multiple myeloma and lung cancer.

Bendamustine received its first marketing approval in Germany, where it is marketed under the tradename Ribomustin, by Astellas Pharma GmbH's licensee, Mundipharma International Corporation Limited. It is indicated as a single-agent or in combination with other anti-cancer agents for indolent non-Hodgkin's lymphoma, multiple myeloma, and chronic lymphocytic leukemia. SymBio Pharmaceuticals Ltd. holds exclusive rights to develop and market bendamustine HCl in Japan and selected Asia Pacific Rim countries.

In March 2008, Cephalon received approval from the United States Food and Drug Administration to market bendamustine in the US, where it is sold under the tradename Treanda, for treatment of chronic lymphocytic leukemia.

In October 2008, the FDA granted further approval to market Treanda for the treatment of indolent B-cell non-Hodgkin's lymphoma that has progressed during or within six months of treatment with rituximab or a rituximab-containing regimen.

== Research ==
Bendamustine was being studied for the treatment of advanced sarcoma. It is also being investigated in phase II trials for the non-cancer treatment of AL amyloidosis.
