= Germinal center B-cell like diffuse large B-cell lymphoma =

Type of cancer

Gene expression profiling has revealed that diffuse large B-cell lymphoma (DLBCL) is composed of at least 3 different sub-groups, each having distinct oncogenic mechanisms that respond to therapies in different ways. Germinal Center B-Cell like (GCB) DLBCLs appear to arise from normal germinal center B cells, while Activated B-cell like (ABC) DLBCLs are thought to arise from postgerminal center B cells that are arrested during plasmacytic differentiation. The differences in gene expression between GCB DLBCL and ABC DLBCL are as vast as the differences between distinct types of leukemia, but these conditions have historically been grouped together and treated as the same disease.

== Genetics ==
A gene translocation between chromosome 14 (containing the antibody heavy chain locus) and chromosome 18 (containing the BCL-2 locus) is present in 45% of GCB DLBCLs but has never been found in ABC DLBCLs. This T(14,18) translocation places the BCL-2 gene close to the heavy chain gene enhancer and results in the overexpression of the Bcl-2 protein. Bcl-2 proteins prevent the activation of the caspases that lead to programmed cell death (apoptosis).

Activation of the nuclear factor kappa-light-chain-enhancer of activated B-cells (NF-κB) pathway is found only in ABC DLBCLs and not GCB DLBCLs.

GCB DLBCL shows amplification of the oncogenic mir-17–92 microRNA cluster and deletion of the tumor suppressor PTEN but these events have not been found in ABC DLBCL

== Normal B-cell maturation process ==
B-cells form in the bone marrow and undergo gene rearrangement in order to develop B-cell receptors (BCRs) that bind to a specific antigen. Once activated by an antigen, B-cells proliferate and further differentiate into plasma cells and memory B-cells. B-cells that have not encountered an antigen are called naive B cells. When naïve B-cells encounter an antigen, one of the pathways that they can follow is through the germinal center environment. B-cells within the germinal center proliferate and undergo immunoglobulin somatic hypermutation (SHM) of IgV region genes to revise their antigen receptors. The rearranging of genes makes the cells capable of generating antibodies with a higher or lower affinity to the specified antigen. Follicular dendritic cells and T cells help to select the B-cells that have a high affinity to the antigen for further differentiation into plasma cells and memory cells. A large fraction of germinal center B-cells acquire somatic mutations that prohibit antigen binding and these undergo apoptosis.

== Pathophysiology ==
Two oncogenic mechanisms that appear to be active in GCB DLBCL are the prevention of apoptosis and the blocking of terminal differentiation.

=== Preventing apoptosis ===
Normal germinal center B-cells appear to be poised for apoptosis unless they are selected to progress to the next stage of differentiation. Most normal germinal center B-cells express low levels of anti-apoptotic proteins such as Bcl-2. In GBC DLBCLs, the T(14,18) translocation can result in an increase of the Bcl-2 protein, which may reduce the number of cells that undergo apoptosis.

=== Blocking differentiation ===
Blocking the differentiation of germinal center B cells is dangerous because the cells are programmed to divide rapidly at this stage. The SHM that occurs in the germinal center can also target non-immunoglobulin loci and may be responsible for translocation of the BCL-6 gene. BCL-6 genes are involved in several cell processes that can affect the ability of the B-cell to differentiate and proliferate. BCL-6 genes produce BCL-6 proteins. These proteins work with other transcription factors (BLIMP1, PAX5, XBP1) to form a regulatory circuit that controls the progression of germinal center B cells to plasma cells. BCL-6 proteins repress genes involved in terminal differentiation and promote proliferation by blocking expression of a cell-cycle inhibitor (p27^{Kip1}). BCL-6 is also an inhibitor of cellular senescence. Cellular senescence is a programmed response that prevents a cell from dividing after some number of cell divisions.

== Treatment ==
DLBCL patients are at higher risk when they relapse early after R-CHOP chemotherapy and have a poor response to second-line rituximab-containing treatments even when these regimens involve high-dose therapy and autologous stem cell transplant. Approximately half of DLBCL patients develop CHOP-resistant cells. A study of DLBCL cell lines indicated that 14-3-3ζ proteins may play a role in mediating resistance of DLBCL cells to CHOP. 14-3-3 proteins exert anti-apoptotic activity by interfering with the function of BH3-only proteins and has been validated as a potential molecular target for anticancer therapeutic development in other types of cancers.

=== Monoclonal antibodies ===
Monoclonal antibodies are made by injecting human cancer cells into mice so that their immune systems create antibodies against foreign antigens. Monoclonal antibodies target specific antigens on cancer cells and may enhance the patient's immune response. They can be administered alone or be linked (conjugated) to anticancer drugs, radioisotopes, or other biologic response modifiers. There are several therapeutic mechanisms for monoclonal antibodies:

1. Directly initiates apoptosis in the targeted cells
2. Antibody-dependent cell-mediated cytotoxicity (ADCC) – Recruits monocytes, macrophages, and natural killer cells to destroy the targeted cells
3. Complement-dependent cytotoxicity (CDC) – Initiates the complement system which activates the membrane attack complex causing cell lysis and death.
4. Delivers chemotherapy or radiation in a targeted manner which allows higher concentrations to be administered

Monoclonal antibodies for treatment of B-cell malignancies

- CD20. Approximately 95% of B-cell lymphomas express CD20, but CD20 is not critical for B-cell survival. Clonal B-cells spontaneously mutate the idiotypic region of their immunoglobulin. This high mutation rate makes them prone to the selection of B-cells lacking the CD20 antigen following treatment with CD20-targeting monoclonal antibodies. As a result, CD20 may lose its effectiveness as a target after as little as one or two treatments with monoclonal antibodies such as rituximab. A study in Japan found that approximately 26% of relapsed B-cell lymphoma patients lost CD20 expression during treatment with rituximab. Lab tests involving 5-Aza showed that CD20 expression and rituximab sensitivity could be restored in some cases using epigenetic drug treatment.
  - Rituximab (Rituxan. The mechanism of action of Rituximab against DLBCL is not fully understood, but studies suggest that rituximab modulates cellular and molecular signal transduction pathways that regulate bcl-2-expression. Interaction between bcl-2 expression and IL-10 growth factors may contribute to the resistance mechanisms of DLBCL to chemotherapy.
  - Tositumomab (Bexxar). Anti-CD20 conjugated with radionuclide iodine-131
  - Ibritumomab tiuxetan (Zevalin). Anti-CD20 conjugated with radioactive isotope (either yttrium-90 or indium-111)
- CD22. Approximately 85% of DLBCLs express CD22. It is expressed on pre-B and mature B cells, and expression is lost upon maturation to plasma cells.
  - Epratuzumab (Lymphocide). After binding epratuzumab, CD22 is rapidly internalized. Cell death does not appear to be mediated by complement, but modest antibody-dependent cellular cytotoxicity and direct killing effects have been demonstrated.
- CD70. In normal lymphoid tissues CD27 and its ligand CD70 have a restricted expression pattern, but a 1999 study found CD70 on 71% of large B-cell lymphomas.
  - Vorsetuzumab mafodotin (antibody conjugated to monomethyl auristatin F). Monomethyl auristatin F is a mitotic inhibitor. Preliminary data from a phase I clinical trial of vorsetuzumab mafodotin showed that of the 7 patients with non-Hodgkin lymphoma, one achieved complete remission, four were stable, one experienced progressive disease, and one was not evaluable.

=== Bcl-2 inhibitors ===
Apoptosis is one of the major mechanisms of cell death targeted by cancer therapies. Reduced susceptibility to apoptosis increases the resistance of cancer cells to radiation and cytotoxic agents. B-cell lymphoma-2 (Bcl-2) family members create a balance between pro and anti-apoptotic proteins. Pro-apoptotic proteins include Bax and Bak. Anti-apoptotic proteins include Bcl-2, Bcl-X_{L}, Bcl-w, Mcl-1. When anti-apoptotic family members are overexpressed, apoptotic cell death becomes less likely.

- Oblimersen sodium (G3139, Genasense) targets BCL-2 mRNA
- ABT-737 (oral form navitoclax, ABT-263). A small molecule that targets anti-apoptotic Bcl-2 family proteins (Bcl-2, Bcl-X_{L} and Bcl-w). ABT-737 binds anti-apoptotic Bcl-2 proteins with an affinity two or three orders of magnitude more potent than previously reported compounds. High basal levels of Mcl-1 expression are associated with resistance to ABT-737. Combining ABT-737 with second agents that inactivate Mcl-1 may reduce this effect. ABT-737 has demonstrated single-agent efficacy against cell lines from lymphoid malignancies known to express high levels of Bcl-2, including DLBCL. It has also been found to be synergistic with proteasome inhibitors.
- Fenretinide. A synthetic retinoid that induces apoptosis of cancer cells and acts synergistically with chemotherapeutic drugs by triggering the activation of 12-Lox (12-lipoxygenase) leading to oxidative stress and apoptosis via the induction of the transcription factor Gadd153 and the Bcl-2-family member protein Bak.

=== mTOR (mammalian target of rapamycin) inhibitors ===
mTOR inhibitors :

- Everolimus
- Temsirolimus

mTOR is a kinase enzyme inside the cell that regulates cell growth, proliferation, and survival. mTOR inhibitors lead to cell cycle arrest in the G1 phase and also inhibits tumor angiogenesis by reducing synthesis of VEGF.

A Phase II trial of Evorolimus on relapsed DLBCL patients showed a 30% Overall Response Rate (ORR).

=== Syk (Spleen Tyrosine Kinase) inhibitors ===
Syk inhibitors include :

- Fostamatinib
- Tamatinib

Chronic signaling through the B-cell receptor appears to contribute to the survival of DLBCL. These survival signals can be blocked by Syk inhibitors. However, since the BCR signaling pathway is not as important to the GCB DLBCL as it is to the ABC subtype, Syk inhibitors may not be effective against GCB DLBCL

=== Proteasome inhibitors ===
- Bortezomib (Velcade)

Proteasome inhibitors inhibit the NF-κB pathway. Since this pathway is not a significant factor in GCB DLBCL, proteasome inhibitors have not been found to be effective against GCB DLBCL. A clinical trial of bortezomib showed that bortezomib alone had no activity in DLBCL, but when combined with chemotherapy, it demonstrated an ORR of 83% in ABC DLBCL and 13% in GCB DLBCL, suggesting that bortezomib enhances the activity of chemotherapy for ABC but not GCB DLBCL when combined with conventional chemotherapy.
