= Ring-enhancing lesion =

Pattern seen in radiologic examinations

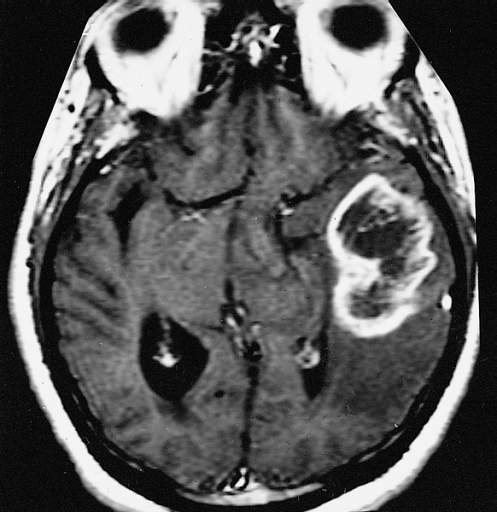
- MRI showing a ring-enhancing lesion in the brain of a patient with glioblastoma multiforme
- Differential diagnosis: Infection, Tumor, Hematoma, Demyelinating disease, Infarct

Ring-enhancing lesion is a radiographic finding defined as an abnormal lesion with central hypodensity (computed tomography) or hypointensity (magnetic resonance imaging) and a peripheral rim of contrast enhancement. These lesions are frequently encountered in the setting of neuroradiology and can resemble a wide range of pathologies. Clinical presentation of the pathologies that can cause a ring-enhancing lesion are oftentimes non-specific, making clinical diagnosis difficult. As a result, it is vital that radiologists not only recognize these lesions, but characterize them based on their appearance, location, and other associated imaging findings in order to make a precise diagnosis. Although the differentials are numerous, the presence of a ring-enhancing lesion is fundamentally abnormal. When brain tissue takes up radiocontrast, this implies disruption of the blood-brain barrier. Therefore, presence of a ring-enhancing lesion requires careful workup and investigation by the radiologist as many of the causes may lead to neurological sequelae and possible death.

== Methods of detection ==
Detection of ring-enhancing lesions may be done using CT (computed tomograghy) or MRI (magnetic resonance imaging). However, brain MRI with contrast enhancement is considered the gold standard technique for assessment and characterization of both benign and malignant neurological lesions. In a review article looking at how MRI compared with CT for the purposes of screening for brain metastases in patients with lung cancer, the sensitivity for MRI was 94.1% compared to CT, which was 74.6%.

== Radiological appearance ==
Cerebral ring-enhancing lesions are described radiographically as a region of central hypodensity (CT) or hypointensity (MRI) within brain tissue that is surrounded by a rim of enhancement that appears after contrast injection. As long as this criterion is met, it does not matter if the peripheral enhancement is smooth or irregular, it is still considered a ring-enhancing lesion.

== Differential diagnosis and distinguishing features ==
=== Infectious causes ===
Infectious causes may include pyogenic abscess, hydatid cyst, fungal abscess, toxoplasmosis, neurocysticercosis, and tuberculosis. Pyogenic abscesses as well as hydatid cysts are typically observed as single lesions, while fungal abscesses, tuberculomas, neurocysticercosis, and cerebral toxoplasmosis are observed as multiple lesions.

A key distinguishing feature to help differentiate these lesions is their specific localization within the brain. Toxoplasmosis, pyogenic abscesses, and neurocysticercosis are most often found at the grey-white matter junctions. More specifically, pyogenic abscesses are usually located in the anterior and middle cerebral artery territories, whereas toxoplasmosis tends to localize to the frontoparietal and thalamic regions. Additionally, lesions of neurocysticercosis may be found in the subarachnoid space and ventricles. Fungal abscesses and toxoplasmosis tend to involve the basal ganglia.

Imaging findings of these lesions have characteristic appearances, especially on MRI. Understanding the specific pattern of appearance on MRI can help further differentiate these lesions. Pyogenic abscesses have a hyperintense center on T2 weighted MRI, with a smooth or lobulated edge and an enhancing wall that is thin and most prominent medially. Tuberculomas have a hypointense/isotense center on T2 weighted MRI, with a similar smooth or lobulated enhancing edge. Tuberculomas may also be identified by the presence of leptomeningeal enhancement in the basal cisterns. Cerebral toxoplasmosis is characterized by the "concentric sign," with the presence of concentric hypointense and hyperintense zones on T2 weighted MRI. Fungal abscesses differ from pyogenic abscesses in that the central zone appears as hypointense on T2 weighted MRI as opposed to hyperintense. Hydatid cysts are described as large, thin-walled lesions, having a hyperintense central zone and are mostly uniloculated, however, they may be multiloculated. Neurocysticercosis lesions are thin-walled calcific nodules, appearing hypointense on T2 weighted MRI.

=== Demyelinating diseases ===
It is important to take note of the fact that certain demyelinating conditions can be confused for tumors radiographically. For example, a tumefactive demyelinating lesion may mimic a high-grade glial tumor. It is important to distinguish between these two because of the serious surgical considerations and complications that may occur.

The appearance of a tumefactive demyelinating lesion is most commonly a single, large ring-enhancing lesion located at the frontal and parietal lobes, with accompanying edema and mass effect. A key finding, which is 98-100% specific for a tumefactive demyelinating lesion is the observation of open ring-enhancement, with a non-enhancing cortical side and an enhancing white-matter side. Additionally, the outer ring of a tumefactive demyelinating lesion is described as being hypointense on T2 weighted MRI.

=== Tumoral causes ===
The three key tumoral causes of ring-enhancing lesions in the brain include: glioblastoma multiforme, primary central nervous system lymphoma, and metastasis. The most common culprit is metastasis. If multiple lesions are present, it is most likely to be glioblastoma multiforme.

Glioblastoma and metastases are both highly vascular lesions. Glioblastoma and metastases both appear with thickened, irregular walls. The appearance of glioblastoma tends to be heterogenous due to the process of bleeding and necrosis. Metastases tend to be more solid and occur usually at the grey-white matter junction. In both glioblastoma and metastases, there is hyperintense vasogenic edema surrounding the lesion. Primary central nervous lymphoma and glioblastoma are unique in that they may cross the corpus callosum, a phenomenon that is less likely to occur with metastases. Primary central nervous lymphoma is an important consideration in the immunocompromised population and may be differentiated from glioblastoma by the presence of open ring enhancement, which is never seen with glioblastoma but sometimes seen with primary central nervous lymphoma. Additionally, whereas metastases and glioblastoma are highly vascular lesions due to neovascularization, primary central nervous system lymphoma is characterized by angiocentric growth.

=== Hematoma ===
A hematoma can appear as a peripherally enhancing lesion on MRI. This is because hematomas have the potential to mimic peripheral enhancement on post-contrast T1 weighted images. However, when examining the pre-contrast T1 weighted MRI images, hematomas appear with a hyperintense periphery. The increased signal intensity is due to increased levels of extracellular methemoglobin during the subacute phase. It is therefore vital to utilize T1 weighted MRI sequences and compare post-contrast and pre-contrast images when peripherally enhancing lesions are observed.

=== Infarct ===
Infarcts occur due to prolonged ischemic destruction of brain tissue. As a result, there is destruction of the blood-brain barrier, leading to parenchymal enhancement. In terms of specific timelines to expect this enhancement, it begins on the third day and peaks at the end of the first week. To confirm that the ring-enhancement is the result of infarction, follow-up examination should identify the presence of cortical laminar necrosis.
