= Adoptive immunity =

Adoptive immunity acts in a host after their immunological components are withdrawn, their immunological activity is modified extracorporeally, and then reinfused into the same host. This process in its former part is analogous to adoption: a child is once adopted out from their home, grown up, and then returned to their home of birth. Transferred immunological components include immune cells such as T lymphocytes or tumour-infiltrating lymphocytes, NK cells, macrophages, or B cells.

There seems to be some variation in usage of this term.

1. Transferred components are immune cells and autologous as above.
2. Transfer of immune cells is made between different individuals of monozygotic twins in human or of the same pure line in experimental animals from immunologically sensitized to naive host, where transferred cells are engrafted without rejection or GVHD in the new host.
3. Transfer of cells are made between allogeneic hosts but the new host is irradiated for preventing rejection or GVHD.
4. Transfer of cells are made between allogeneic hosts.
5. Transferred components include cells as well as immune molecules such as immunoglobulins between allogeneic hosts.

The term is used almost synonymously for "passive immunity" in some situations, however, passive immunity acts among xenogeneic hosts; for example, in snake venom immunotherapy, antivenom IgG is obtained from sensitized horse and inoculated to humans.

== Immunological terms with an adjective "adoptive" ==
The following terms might indicate procedures involving similar immunological transfer processes.

- adoptive transfer
- adoptive immunization
- adoptive immunotherapy
  - Adoptive cell therapy
- adoptive tolerance
