= NGR-hTNF (antitumor recombinant protein) =

NGR-hTNF is an experimental antitumor drug designed to act on tumor blood vessels. It is currently undergoing Phase III clinical trials for treatment of malignant pleural mesothelioma caused by exposure to asbestos. NGR-hTNF is also being investigated, alone or in combination with chemotherapy, on four different solid tumors in four other randomized Phase II trials.

NGR-hTNF is a recombinant protein derived from the fusion between peptide CNGRCG and human tumor necrosis factor alpha (TNFα). Once it has reached the tumor, NGR-hTNF performs its antitumor action. The Phase III (NGR015) clinical trial is in progress in 35 clinical centers in Europe (Italy, UK, Ireland, Poland and Belgium), the US, Canada and Egypt. NGR-hTNF is the only drug being tested in Phase III trials for the treatment of relapsed Mesothelioma, and has been granted orphan drug designation both in Europe and the US.
