= B symptoms =

Symptoms associated with lymphoma

B symptoms are a set of symptoms, namely fever, night sweats, and unintentional weight loss, that can be associated with both Hodgkin lymphoma and non-Hodgkin lymphoma. These symptoms are not specific to lymphomas, especially each one considered individually, and even as a trio they are not pathognomonic for lymphomas, but the presence of the trio is sensitive enough for lymphomas to warrant diagnostic investigation and differential diagnosis. The presence or absence of B symptoms has prognostic significance in lymphomas and is reflected in their staging.

== Description and nomenclature ==
B symptoms are so called because Ann Arbor staging of lymphomas includes both a number (I–IV) and a letter (A or B). "A" indicates the absence of systemic symptoms, while "B" indicates their presence.

B symptoms include:

- Fever greater than 38 °C. Pel–Ebstein fever, the classic intermittent fever associated with Hodgkin disease, occurs at variable intervals of days to weeks and lasts for 1–2 weeks before resolving. However, fever associated with lymphoma can follow virtually any pattern.
- Drenching sweats, especially at night.
- Unintentional weight loss of >10% of normal body weight over a period of 6 months or less.

== Prognostic importance ==
The presence of B symptoms is a marker for more advanced disease with systemic, rather than merely local, involvement. B symptoms are a clear negative prognostic factor in Hodgkin lymphoma. The relevance of B symptoms in non-Hodgkin lymphoma is less clear, although B symptoms tend to correlate with disease that is either more widespread or of a higher histologic grade.

=== Relative importance of specific B symptoms ===
It has been suggested that, in Hodgkin lymphoma, fever and weight loss are much more prognostically significant than night sweats. In one series of patients with early-stage Hodgkin disease, the presence or absence of night sweats had no impact on cure rates and outcome. However, fever and weight loss had a pronounced negative impact on cure and survival rates, regardless of treatment modality.
