= Ann Arbor staging =

Staging system for lymphomas

Ann Arbor staging is the staging system for lymphomas, both in Hodgkin's lymphoma (formerly designated Hodgkin's disease) and non-Hodgkin lymphoma (abbreviated NHL). It was initially developed for Hodgkin's, but has some use in NHL. It has roughly the same function as TNM staging in solid tumors.

The stage depends on both the place where the malignant tissue is located (as located with biopsy, CT scanning, gallium scan and increasingly positron emission tomography) and on systemic symptoms due to the lymphoma ("B symptoms": night sweats, weight loss of >10% or fevers).

== Principal stages ==
The principal stage is determined by location of the tumor:

- Stage I indicates that the cancer is located in a single region, usually one lymph node and the surrounding area. Stage I often will not have outward symptoms.
- Stage II indicates that the cancer is located in two separate regions, an affected lymph node or lymphatic organ and a second affected area, and that both affected areas are confined to one side of the diaphragm—that is, both are above the diaphragm, or both are below the diaphragm.
- Stage III indicates that the cancer has spread to both sides of the diaphragm, including one organ or area near the lymph nodes or the spleen.
- Stage IV indicates diffuse or disseminated involvement of one or more extralymphatic organs, including any involvement of the liver, bone marrow, or nodular involvement of the lungs.

== Modifiers ==
These letters can be appended to some stages:

- A or B: the absence of constitutional (B-type) symptoms is denoted by adding an "A" to the stage; the presence is denoted by adding a "B" to the stage.
- S: is used if the disease has spread to the spleen.
- E: is used if the disease is "extranodal" (not in the lymph nodes) or has spread from lymph nodes to adjacent tissue.
- X: is used if the largest deposit is >10 cm large ("bulky disease"), or whether the mediastinum is wider than one-third of the chest on a chest X-ray.

== Type of staging ==
The nature of the staging is (occasionally) expressed with:

- CS: clinical stage as obtained by doctor's examinations and tests.
- PS: pathological stage as obtained by exploratory laparotomy (surgery performed through an abdominal incision) with splenectomy (surgical removal of the spleen). Note: exploratory laparotomy has fallen out of favor for lymphoma staging.

== Limitations ==
The staging does not take into account the grade (biological behavior) of the tumor tissue. The prognostic significance of bulky disease, and some other modifiers, were introduced with the "Cotswolds modification".

== History ==
The Ann Arbor classification is named after Ann Arbor, Michigan, where the Committee on Hodgkin's Disease Staging Classification met in 1971; it consisted of experts from the United States, UK, Germany and France, and replaced the older Rye classification from a 1965 meeting. The Cotswolds modification followed after a 1988 meeting in the UK Cotswolds.
