= CHOP (chemotherapy) =

Treatment for non-Hodgkin lymphoma

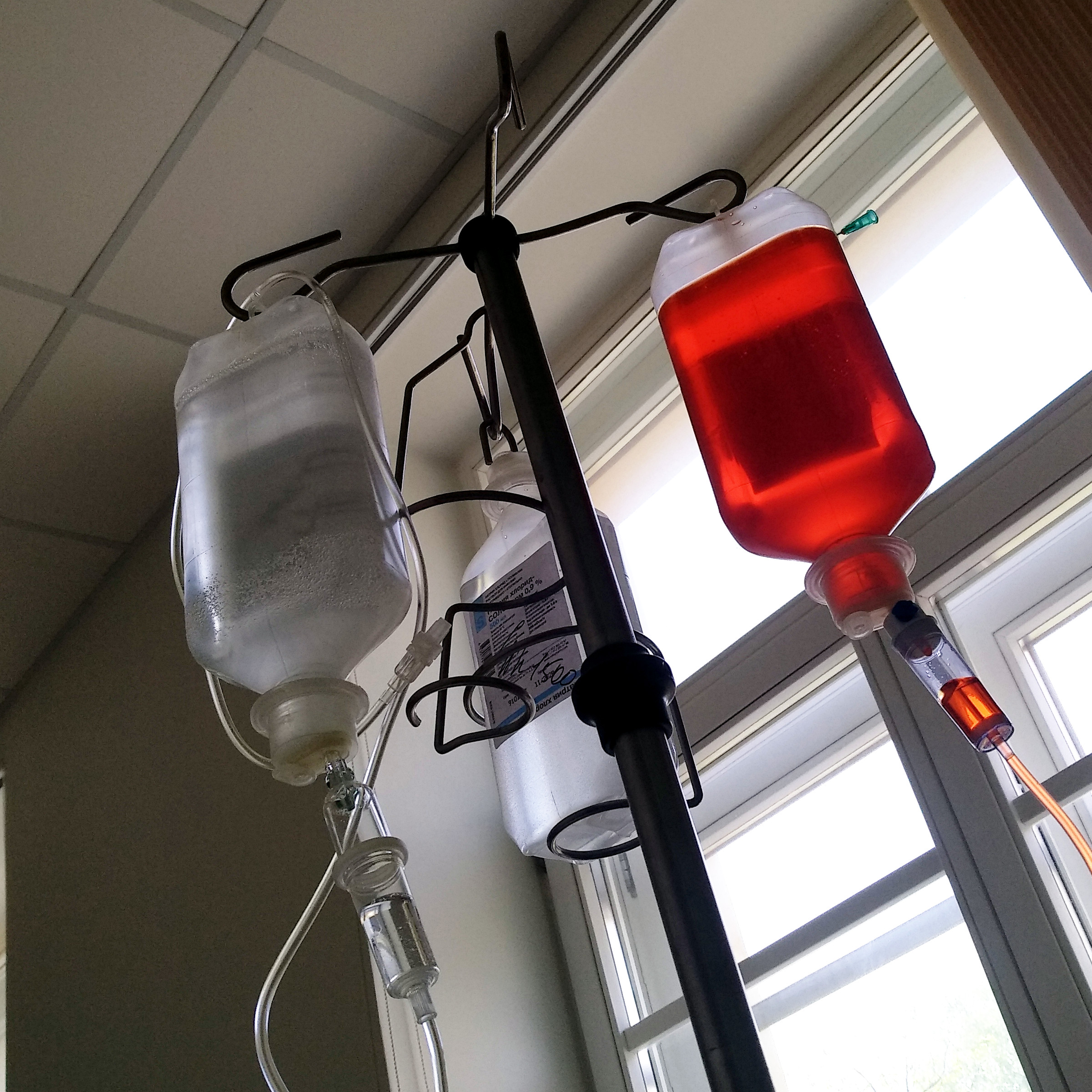
Infusion of R,C,H and O components of R-CHOP. Red flask contains doxorubicin (H), the most toxic component. Prednisolone (P) is administered on the next four or five days intravenously or in tablets.

CHOP is the acronym for a chemotherapy regimen used in the treatment of non-Hodgkin lymphoma. CHOP consists of:

- Cyclophosphamide, an alkylating agent which damages DNA by binding to it and causing the formation of cross-links
- Hydroxydaunorubicin (also called doxorubicin or adriamycin), an intercalating agent which damages DNA by inserting itself between DNA bases
- Oncovin (vincristine), which prevents cells from duplicating by binding to the protein tubulin
- Prednisone or Prednisolone, which are corticosteroids.

Sometimes the chimeric anti-CD20 monoclonal antibody, rituximab, is added to this treatment regimen to form the R-CHOP regimen.

== Dosing regimen ==
Drug	Standard [R]-CHOP-14 or [R]-CHOP-21	[R]-miniCHOP	[R]-Maxi-CHOP	Mode	Days
Rituximab	375 mg/m^{2}	375 mg/m^{2}	375 mg/m^{2}	IV infusion	Day 1
Cyclophosphamide	750 mg/m^{2}	400 mg/m^{2}	1200 mg/m^{2}	IV infusion	Day 1
Hydroxydaunorubicin	50 mg/m^{2}	25 mg/m^{2}	75 mg/m^{2}	IV bolus	Day 1
Oncovin	1.4 mg/m^{2} (max. 2 mg)	1 mg	2 mg	IV bolus	Day 1
Prednisone or Prednisolone	40 mg/m^{2}	40 mg/m^{2}	100 mg	PO qd	Days 1-5

R-miniCHOP is indicated in elderly patients (>80 years) with diffuse large B-cell lymphoma due to less toxicity from the reduced dose in comparison to R-CHOP.

R-Maxi-CHOP is used in mantle cell lymphoma and is given in 21-day intervals, alternating with R-HDAC (rituximab + high-dose cytarabine).

In most other non-Hodgkin lymphomas (excluding some aggressive forms), standard-dose [R]-CHOP is generally used as first-line therapy.

== Uses and indications ==
Normal cells are more able than cancer cells to repair damage from chemotherapy drugs.

This regimen can also be combined with the monoclonal antibody rituximab if the lymphoma is of B cell origin; this combination is called R-CHOP. In 2002, a randomized controlled trial showed a higher complete response rate for R-CHOP vs CHOP in elderly patients with Diffuse Large-B-Cell Lymphoma (76% vs 63%). Typically, courses are administered at an interval of two or three weeks (CHOP-14 and CHOP-21 respectively). A staging CT scan is generally performed after three cycles to assess whether the disease is responding to treatment.

In patients with a history of cardiovascular disease, doxorubicin (which is cardiotoxic) is often deemed to be too great a risk and is omitted from the regimen. The combination is then referred to as COP (cyclophosphamide, Oncovin, and prednisone or prednisolone) or CVP (cyclophosphamide, vincristine, and prednisone or prednisolone).

As elderly patients have a greater risk of toxicity from the drugs, an option is to use an attenuated drug regimen, called miniCHOP.

== Side-effects and complications ==
Chemotherapy-induced nausea and vomiting may require antiemetics (such as ondansetron), and hemorrhagic cystitis is prevented with administration of mesna. Alopecia (hair loss) is common.

Neutropenia generally develops in the second week. During this period, many clinicians recommend pegfilgrastim or prophylactic use of ciprofloxacin. If a fever develops in the neutropenic period, urgent medical assessment is required for neutropenic sepsis, as infections in patients with low neutrophil counts may progress rapidly.

Allopurinol is typically co-administered prophylactically to prevent hyperuricemia that results from tumor lysis syndrome, the result of rapid death of tumor cells.

== History ==
A pivotal study published in 1993 compared CHOP to several other chemotherapy regimens (e.g. m-BACOD, ProMACE-CytaBOM, MACOP-B) for advanced non-Hodgkin lymphoma. CHOP emerged as the regimen with the least toxicity but similar efficacy.

However, in Germany in 2012, bendamustine has displaced [R-]CHOP to become the first line treatment of choice for indolent lymphoma (a less aggressive subset of non-Hodgkin lymphoma).

== [R]-CHOEP modification ==
In order to develop more effective first-line chemotherapy regimen for aggressive lymphomas, some researchers tried to add Etoposide to the standard [R]-CHOP regimen.

There were also attempts to further improve the efficacy of the [R]-CHOEP regimen with escalating the chemotherapy doses. This mode was called [R]-High-CHOEP. However, it did not show more effectiveness than standard-dose [R]-CHOEP while adding more toxicity and cost.

In order to try improving efficacy of the [R]-CHOEP, some researchers tried to escalate chemotherapy to very high doses, requiring autologous stem cell support in each cycle. Doses in that regimen were increased from cycle to cycle. This regimen was called [R]-MegaCHOEP. But again, such escalation seemed to not improve effectiveness while adding toxicity.

Drug	Standard [R]-CHOEP	[R]-High-CHOEP	[R]-Mega-CHOEP, cycle 1	[R]-Mega-CHOEP, cycles 2 and 3	[R]-Mega-CHOEP, cycle 4 (last)	Mode	Days
Rituximab	375 mg/m^{2}	375 mg/m^{2}	375 mg/m^{2}	375 mg/m^{2}	375 mg/m^{2}	IV infusion	Day 1
Cyclophosphamide	750 mg/m^{2}	1400 mg/m^{2}	1500 mg/m^{2}	4500 mg/m^{2}	6000 mg/m^{2}	IV infusion	Day 1
Hydroxydaunorubicin	50 mg/m^{2}	65 mg/m^{2}	70 mg/m^{2}	70 mg/m^{2}	70 mg/m^{2}	IV bolus	Day 1
Oncovin	1.4 mg/m^{2} (max 2 mg)	2 mg	2 mg	2 mg	2 mg	IV bolus	Day 1
Etoposide	100 mg/m^{2}	175 mg/m^{2}	600 mg/m^{2}	960 mg/m^{2}	1480 mg/m^{2}	IV infusion	Days 1-3
Prednisone or Prednisolone	40 mg/m^{2}	100 mg	500 mg	500 mg	500 mg	PO qd	Days 1-5

== See also ==
- Chemotherapy regimens
- EPOCH chemotherapy
