= Rituximab =

Biopharmaceutical drug

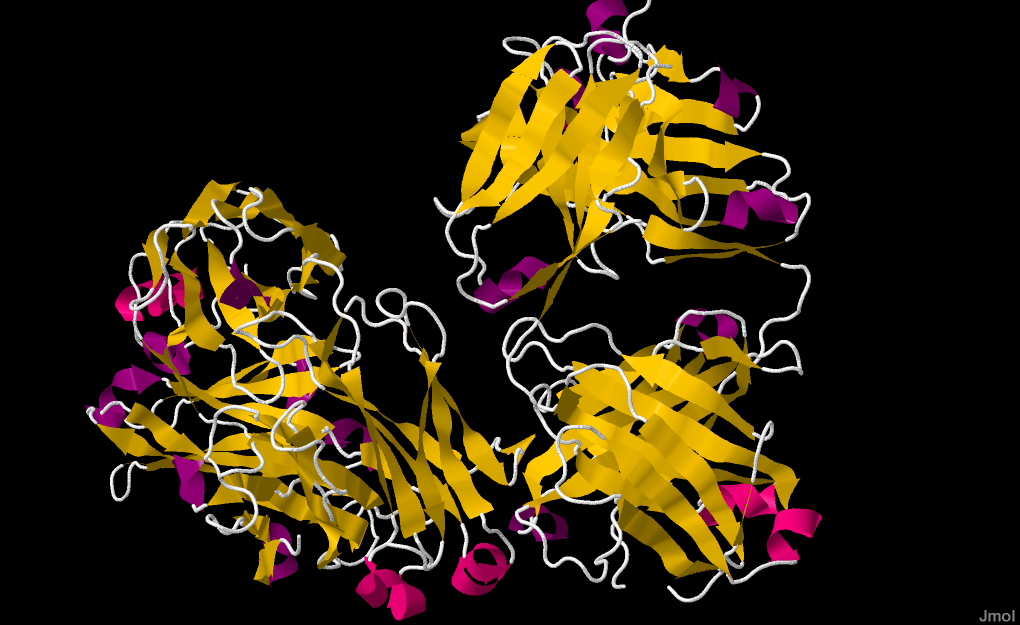

Monoclonal antibody
- Type: Whole antibody
- Source: Chimeric (mouse/human)
- Target: CD20

Clinical data
- Trade names: Rituxan, MabThera, others
- Biosimilars: rituximab-abbs, rituximab-arrx, rituximab-cdxx, rituximab-pvvr, Blitzima, Ituxredi, Riabni, Rixathon, Riximyo, Ruxience, Truxima, Zimrixby
- AHFS/Drugs.com: Monograph
- MedlinePlus: a607038
- License data: US DailyMed: Rituximab
- Pregnancy category: AU: C
- Routes of administration: Intravenous
- Drug class: Monoclonal antibody
- ATC code: L01FA01 (WHO)

Legal status
- Legal status: AU: S4 (Prescription only); CA: ℞-only / Schedule D; UK: POM (Prescription only); US: ℞-only; EU: Rx-only

Pharmacokinetic data
- Bioavailability: 100% (IV)
- Elimination half-life: 30 to 400 hours (varies by dose and length of treatment)
- Excretion: Uncertain: may undergo phagocytosis and catabolism in RES

Identifiers
- CAS Number: 174722-31-7
- DrugBank: DB00073
- ChemSpider: none
- UNII: 4F4X42SYQ6
- KEGG: D02994
- ChEMBL: ChEMBL1201576
- CompTox Dashboard (EPA): DTXSID5040910
- ECHA InfoCard: 100.224.382

Chemical and physical data
- Formula: C_{6416}H_{9874}N_{1688}O_{1987}S_{44}
- Molar mass: 143860.04 g·mol^{−1}

Rituximab, sold under the brand name Rituxan among others, is a monoclonal antibody medication used to treat certain autoimmune diseases and types of cancer, as well as for prevention and/or treatment of antibody-mediated rejection of organ transplants. It is used for non-Hodgkin lymphoma, chronic lymphocytic leukemia, rheumatoid arthritis, granulomatosis with polyangiitis, idiopathic thrombocytopenic purpura, pemphigus vulgaris, myasthenia gravis and Epstein–Barr virus-positive mucocutaneous ulcers. It is given by slow intravenous infusion.

The most common side effects with intravenous infusions are reactions related to the infusion (such as fever, chills and shivering) while most common serious side effects are infusion reactions, infections and heart-related problems. Similar side effects are seen when it is injected under the skin, with the exception of reactions around the injections site (pain, swelling and rash), which occur more frequently with the skin injections.

Severe side effects include reactivation of hepatitis B in those previously infected, progressive multifocal leukoencephalopathy, toxic epidermal necrolysis, and death. It is unclear if use during pregnancy is safe for the developing fetus or newborn baby.

Rituximab is a chimeric monoclonal antibody against the protein CD20, which is primarily found on the surface of immune system B cells. When it binds to this protein it triggers cell death.

Rituximab was approved for medical use in 1997. It is on the World Health Organization's List of Essential Medicines. Rituxan is co-marketed by Biogen and Genentech in the US, by Roche elsewhere except Japan, and co-marketed by Chugai Pharmaceuticals and Zenyaku Kogyo in Japan.

== Medical uses ==
Rituximab is a chimeric monoclonal antibody targeted against CD20, a surface antigen present on B cells. It acts by depleting normal as well as pathogenic B cells while sparing plasma cells and hematopoietic stem cells, which do not express the CD20 surface antigen.

In the United States, rituximab is indicated to treat:

1. non-Hodgkin lymphoma
2. chronic lymphocytic leukemia
3. rheumatoid arthritis having inadequate response to one or more TNF inhibitors
4. vasculitides such as granulomatosis with polyangiitis and microscopic polyangiitis
5. moderate to severe pemphigus vulgaris
6. in combination with chemotherapy for children (≥ 6 months to < 18 years) with previously untreated, advanced stage, CD20-positive diffuse large B-cell lymphoma (DLBCL), Burkitt lymphoma (BL), Burkitt-like lymphoma (BLL), or mature acute B-cell leukemia (B-AL)
7. antibody-mediated rejection of transplanted organs.

In the European Union, rituximab is indicated for the treatment of follicular lymphoma and diffuse large B cell non-Hodgkin's lymphoma (two types of non-Hodgkin's lymphoma, a blood cancer); chronic lymphocytic leukemia (CLL, another blood cancer affecting white blood cells); severe rheumatoid arthritis (an inflammatory condition of the joints); two inflammatory conditions of blood vessels known as granulomatosis with polyangiitis (GPA) and microscopic polyangiitis (MPA); moderate to severe pemphigus vulgaris, an autoimmune disease characterised by widespread blistering and erosion of the skin and mucous membranes (the linings of internal organs). 'Autoimmune' means that the disease is caused by the immune system (the body's natural defences) attacking the body's own cells.

=== Blood cancers ===
Rituximab is used to treat cancers of the white blood system such as leukemias and lymphomas, including non-Hodgkin's lymphoma, chronic lymphocytic leukemia, and nodular lymphocyte predominant Hodgkin's lymphoma. This also includes Waldenström's macroglobulinemia, a type of non-Hodgkin lymphoma. Rituximab in combination with hyaluronidase human, sold under the brand names MabThera SC and Rituxan Hycela, is used to treat follicular lymphoma, diffuse large B-cell lymphoma, and chronic lymphocytic leukemia. It is used in combination with fludarabine and cyclophosphamide to treat previously untreated and previously treated CD20-positive chronic lymphocytic leukemia.

=== Autoimmune diseases ===
Rituximab has been shown to be an effective rheumatoid arthritis treatment in three randomised controlled trials and is now licensed for use in refractory rheumatoid disease. In the United States, it has been FDA approved for use in combination with methotrexate for reducing signs and symptoms in adult patients with moderately to severely active rheumatoid arthritis (RA) who have had an inadequate response to one or more anti-TNF-alpha therapy. In the European Union, the license is slightly more restrictive: it is licensed for use in combination with methotrexate in patients with severe active RA who have had an inadequate response to one or more anti-TNF therapy.

There is some evidence for efficacy, but not necessarily safety, in a range of other autoimmune diseases, and rituximab is widely used off-label to treat difficult cases of multiple sclerosis, systemic lupus erythematosus, chronic inflammatory demyelinating polyneuropathy and autoimmune anemias. The most dangerous, although among the most rare, side effect is progressive multifocal leukoencephalopathy infection, which is usually fatal; however, only a very small number of cases have been recorded occurring in autoimmune diseases.

Other autoimmune diseases that have been treated with rituximab include autoimmune hemolytic anemia, pure red cell aplasia, thrombotic thrombocytopenic purpura (TTP), idiopathic thrombocytopenic purpura (ITP), Evans syndrome, vasculitis (e.g., granulomatosis with polyangiitis), bullous skin disorders (for example, pemphigus, pemphigoid—with very encouraging results of approximately 85% rapid recovery in pemphigus, according to a 2006 study), type 1 diabetes mellitus, Sjögren's disease, anti-NMDA receptor encephalitis and Devic's disease(Anti-AQP4 disease, MOG antibody disease), Graves' ophthalmopathy, autoimmune pancreatitis, Opsoclonus myoclonus syndrome (OMS), and IgG4-related disease. There is some evidence that it is ineffective in treating IgA-mediated autoimmune diseases.

=== Organ rejection ===
Rituximab is used off-label for treating antibody mediated rejection (AMR) in transplant patients.

== Adverse events ==
Serious adverse events, which can cause death and disability, include:

- Severe infusion reaction
- Cardiac arrest
- Cytokine release syndrome
- Tumor lysis syndrome, causing acute kidney injury
- Infections
  - Progressive multifocal leukoencephalopathy caused by JC virus reactivation
  - Hepatitis B reactivation
  - Other viral infections
- Immune toxicity, with depletion of B cells in 70% to 80% of lymphoma patients
- Pulmonary toxicity
- Bowel obstruction and perforation

A concern with continuous rituximab treatment is the difficulty to induce a proper vaccine response. This was brought into focus during the COVID-19 pandemic, where persons with multiple sclerosis and rituximab treatment had higher risk of severe COVID-19. In persons previously treated with rituximab for multiple sclerosis, nine of ten patients who delayed re-dosing until B cell counts passed 40/μL developed protective levels of antibodies after vaccination with the Pfizer–BioNTech COVID-19 vaccine.

== Mechanisms of action ==
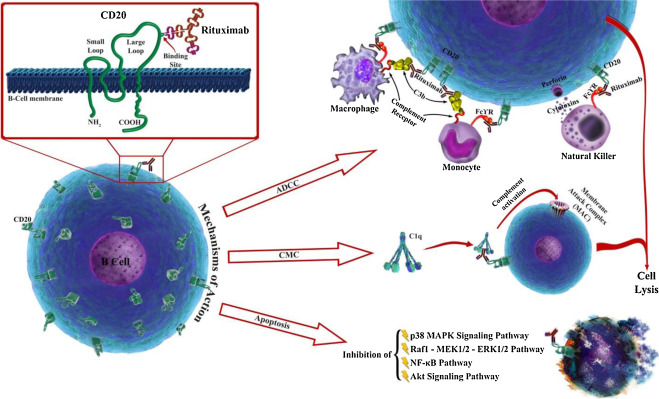
Rituximab mechanisms of action; the three major independent mechanisms are (1) antibody dependent cellular cytotoxicity (ADCC), (2) complement mediated cytotoxicity (CMC), and (3) apoptosis; subset panel illustrates a schematic view of CD20 structure and rituximab.

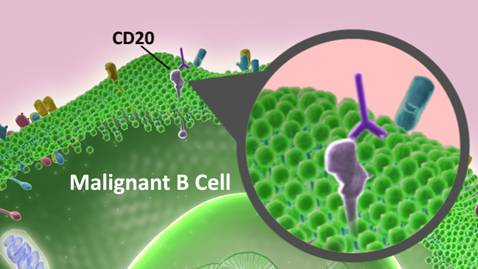
Rituximab binding to CD20. The CD20 proteins are sticking out of the cell membrane, and rituximab, the Y-shaped antibody, is binding to the CD20 proteins.

The antibody binds to the cell surface protein CD20. CD20 is widely expressed on B cells, from early pre-B cells to later in differentiation, but it is absent on terminally differentiated plasma cells. Although the function of CD20 is unknown, it may play a role in Ca^{2+} influx across plasma membranes, maintaining intracellular Ca^{2+} concentration and allowing activation of B cells.

Rituximab is relatively ineffective in elimination of cells with low CD20 cell-surface levels. It tends to stick to one side of B cells, where CD20 is, forming a cap and drawing proteins over to that side. The presence of the cap changes the effectiveness of natural killer (NK) cells in destroying these B cells. When an NK cell latched onto the cap, it had an 80% success rate at killing the cell. In contrast, when the B cell lacked this asymmetric protein cluster, it was killed only 40% of the time.

The following effects have been found:

- The Fc portion of rituximab mediates antibody-dependent cellular cytotoxicity (ADCC) and complement-dependent cytotoxicity (CDC).
- Rituximab has a general regulatory effect on the cell cycle.
- Preferential elimination of malignant B cells with high CD20 levels and high BCR signaling propensity, especially in chronic lymphocytic leukemia (CLL).
- It increases MHC II and adhesion molecules LFA-1 and LFA-3 (lymphocyte function-associated antigen).
- It elicits shedding of CD23.
- It downregulates the B cell receptor.
- It induces apoptosis of CD20+ cells.
- Rituximab also induces a release of some chronic lymphocytic leukemia cells from immune niches, which might make them more sensitive to chemotherapy used in combination with an anti-CD20 antibody.

The combined effect results in the elimination of B cells (including the cancerous ones) from the body, allowing a new population of healthy B cells to develop from lymphoid stem cells.

Rituximab binds to amino acids 170–173 and 182–185 on CD20, which are physically close to each other as a result of a disulfide bond between amino acids 167 and 183.

== History ==
Rituximab was developed by IDEC Pharmaceuticals under the name IDEC-C2B8. The US patent for the drug was issued in 1998 and expired in 2015.

Based on its safety and effectiveness in clinical trials, rituximab was approved by the US Food and Drug Administration (FDA) in 1997 to treat B-cell non-Hodgkin lymphomas resistant to other chemotherapy regimens. Rituximab, in combination with CHOP chemotherapy, is superior to CHOP alone in the treatment of diffuse large B-cell lymphoma and many other B-cell lymphomas. In 2010, it was authorized by the European Commission for maintenance treatment after initial treatment of follicular lymphoma.

It is on the World Health Organization's List of Essential Medicines.

Originally available for intravenous injection (e.g. over 2.5 hrs), in 2016, it gained EU approval in a formulation for subcutaneous injection for B-cell CLL/lymphoma (CLL).

In June 2017, the US FDA granted regular approval to the combination of rituximab and hyaluronidase human (brand name Rituxan Hycela) for adults with follicular lymphoma, diffuse large B-cell lymphoma, and chronic lymphocytic leukemia. The combination is not indicated for the treatment of non-malignant conditions. The combination was approved based on clinical studies SABRINA/NCT01200758 and MabEase/NCT01649856.

In September 2019, the US FDA approved rituximab injection to treat granulomatosis with polyangiitis and microscopic polyangiitis in children two years of age and older in combination with glucocorticoids (steroid hormones). It is the first approved treatment for children with these rare vasculitis diseases, in which a person's small blood vessels become inflamed, reducing the amount of blood that can flow through them. This can cause serious problems and damage to organs, most notably the lungs and the kidneys. It also can impact the sinuses and skin. Rituximab was approved by the FDA to treat adults with granulomatosis with polyangiitis and microscopic polyangiitis in 2011.

In December 2021, the US FDA approved rituximab in combination with chemotherapy for children aged 6 months to 18 years with previously untreated, advanced stage, CD20-positive diffuse large B-cell lymphoma, Burkitt lymphoma, Burkitt-like lymphoma, or mature B-cell acute leukemia. Efficacy was evaluated in Inter-B-NHL Ritux 2010, a global multicenter, open-label, randomized 1:1 trial of participants six months in age or older with previously untreated, advanced stage, CD20-positive diffuse large B-cell lymphoma, Burkitt lymphoma, Burkitt-like lymphoma, or B-cell acute leukemia. Advanced stage was defined as stage III with elevated lactose dehydrogenase level (lactose dehydrogenase greater than twice the institutional upper limit of normal values) or stage IV B-cell non-Hodgkin's lymphoma or B-cell acute leukemia. Participants were randomized to Lymphome Malin B chemotherapy that consisted of corticosteroids, vincristine, cyclophosphamide, high-dose methotrexate, cytarabine, doxorubicin, etoposide, and triple drug (methotrexate/cytarabine/corticosteroid) intrathecal therapy alone or in combination with rituximab or non-US licensed rituximab, administered as six infusions of rituximab IV at a dose of 375 mg/m2 as per the Lymphome Malin B scheme.

== Society and culture ==
=== Legal status ===
Rituximab was approved for medical use in the United States in November 1997.

==== Biosimilars ====
Biosimilars are approved in the United States, India, the European Union, Switzerland, Japan, and Australia. The U.S. FDA approved rituximab-abbs (Truxima) in 2018, rituximab-pvvr (Ruxience) in 2019, and rituximab-arrx (Riabni) in 2020.

In July 2024, the Committee for Medicinal Products for Human Use of the European Medicines Agency recommended marketing authorization for the rituximab biosimilar Ituxredi produced by Dr. Reddy's Laboratories / Holding GmbH. Ituxredi is intended for the treatment of non-Hodgkin's lymphoma, chronic lymphocytic leukemia, rheumatoid arthritis, granulomatosis with polyangiitis and microscopic polyangiitis and pemphigus vulgaris. Ituxredi was authorized for medical use in the European Union in September 2024.

A Rituximab biosimilar was approved in India in 2007.

=== Economics ===
In 2014, Genentech reclassified Rituxan as a specialty drug, a class of drugs that are only available through specialty distributors in the US. Because wholesalers discounts and rebates no longer apply, hospitals would pay more.

Patents on rituximab have expired in the European Union and in the United States. Biosimilars were approved in the United States, India, the European Union, Switzerland, Japan, and Australia. The US FDA approved rituximab-abbs (Truxima) in 2018, rituximab-pvvr (Ruxience) in 2019, and rituximab-arrx (Riabni) in 2020. Truxima and Riabni are approximately $3600 per 500 mg, wholesale - 10% less than Rituxan, while Ruxience is 24% less than Rituxan. The Indian biosimilar ituxredi retails for about 1/6 the price.

==== Tailored-dosing ====
Tailored-dose rituximab is more cost-effective than fixed-dose. It is both more effective and less expensive.

== Research ==
Rituximab has been reported as a possible cofactor in a chronic hepatitis E infection in a person with lymphoma. Hepatitis E infection is normally an acute infection, suggesting the drug in combination with lymphoma may have weakened the body's immune response to the virus.

=== Myalgic encephalomyelitis/chronic fatigue syndrome ===
In 2009, a patient receiving methotrexate-induced B-cell depletion for cancer treatment, experienced a transient remittal of their myalgic encephalomyelitis/chronic fatigue syndrome (ME/CFS) symptoms. While initial trials using Rituximab were promising, a phase 3 trial published in 2019 did not find an association between Rituximab treatment and improvements in ME/CFS.

=== Intrathecal ===
For CNS diseases, rituximab could be administered intrathecally and this possibility is under study.

=== Other anti-cd20 monoclonals ===
The efficacy and success of rituximab has led to some other anti-CD20 monoclonal antibodies being developed:

- ocrelizumab, humanized (90%-95% human) B cell-depleting agent.
- ofatumumab (HuMax-CD20) a fully human B cell-depleting agent.
- Third-generation anti-CD20s such as obinutuzumab have a glycoengineered Fc fragment (Fc) with enhanced binding to Fc gamma receptors, which increase ADCC (antibody-dependent cellular cytotoxicity). This strategy for enhancing a monoclonal antibody's ability to induce ADCC takes advantage of the fact that the displayed Fc glycan controls the antibody's affinity for Fc receptors.
