= Lymphoma =

Hematologic cancer that affects lymphocytes

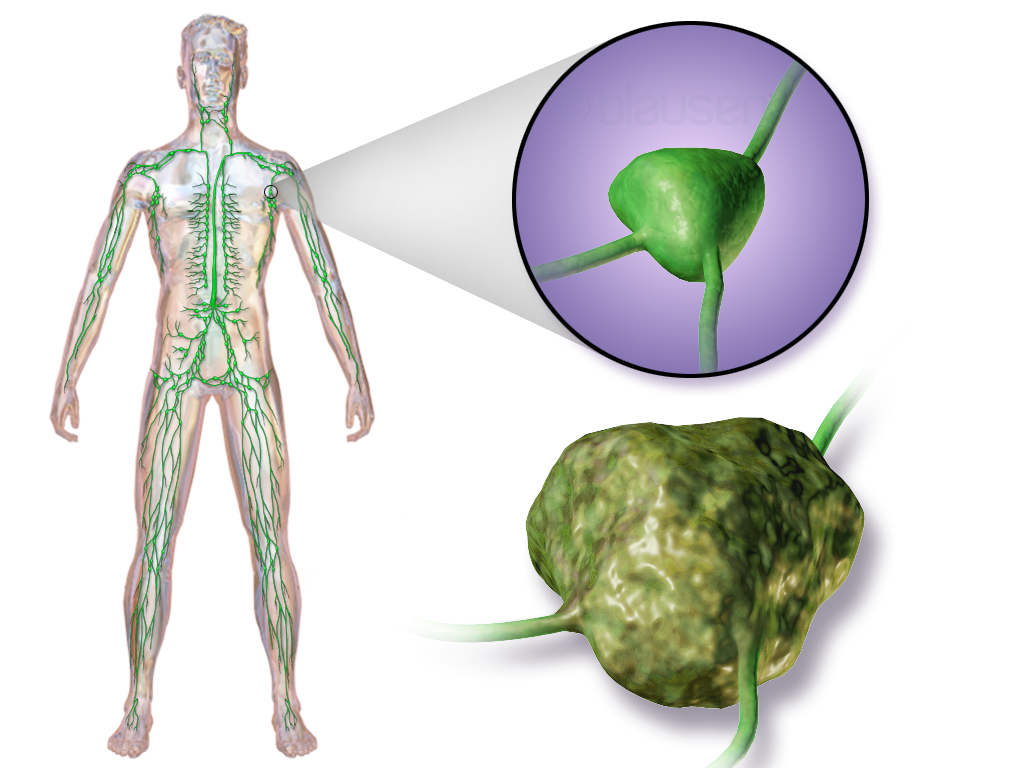
- Illustration depicting lymphoma developing in the lymphatic system
- Specialty: Hematology and oncology
- Symptoms: Enlarged lymph nodes, fever, sweats, unintended weight loss, itching, feeling tired
- Risk factors: Epstein–Barr virus, autoimmune diseases, HIV/AIDS, tobacco smoking
- Diagnostic method: Lymph node biopsy
- Treatment: Chemotherapy, radiation therapy, proton therapy, targeted therapy, surgery
- Prognosis: Average five year survival 85% (USA)
- Frequency: 4.9 million (2015)
- Deaths: 204,700 (2015)

Lymphoma is a group of blood and lymph tumors that develop from lymphocytes (a type of white blood cell). The name typically refers to just the cancerous versions rather than all such tumors. Signs and symptoms may include enlarged lymph nodes, fever, drenching sweats, unintended weight loss, itching, and constantly feeling tired. The enlarged lymph nodes are usually painless. The sweats are most common at night.

The two main categories of lymphomas are the non-Hodgkin lymphoma (NHL) (90% of cases) and Hodgkin lymphoma (HL) (10%). Lymphomas, leukemias and myelomas are a part of the broader group of tumors of the hematopoietic and lymphoid tissues.

Risk factors for Hodgkin lymphoma include infection with Epstein–Barr virus and a history of the disease in the family. Risk factors for common types of non-Hodgkin lymphomas include autoimmune diseases, HIV/AIDS, infection with human T-lymphotropic virus, immunosuppressant medications, and some pesticides. Eating large amounts of red meat and tobacco smoking may also increase the risk. Diagnosis, if enlarged lymph nodes are present, is usually by lymph node biopsy. Blood, urine, and bone marrow testing may also be useful in the diagnosis. Medical imaging may then be done to determine if and where the cancer has spread. Lymphoma most often spreads to the lungs, liver, and brain.

Treatment may involve one or more of the following: chemotherapy, radiation therapy, proton therapy, targeted therapy, and surgery. In some non-Hodgkin lymphomas, an increased amount of protein produced by the lymphoma cells causes the blood to become so thick that plasmapheresis is performed to remove the protein. Watchful waiting may be appropriate for certain types. The outcome depends on the subtype, with some being curable and treatment prolonging survival in most. The five-year survival rate in the United States for all Hodgkin lymphoma subtypes is 89%, while that for non-Hodgkin lymphomas is 74%. Worldwide, lymphomas developed in 566,000 people in 2012 and caused 305,000 deaths. They make up 3–4% of all cancers, making them as a group the seventh-most-common form. In children, they are the third-most-common cancer. They occur more often in the developed world than in the developing world.

== Signs and symptoms ==
The lymph nodes where lymphoma most commonly develops

Lymphoma commonly presents with painless, persistent lymphadenopathy (swelling of the lymph nodes) and can vary from rapidly enlarging lymph nodes in aggressive lymphomas to fluctuating lymphadenopathy in slow-growing subtypes.

B symptoms are a set of symptoms consisting of fever, night sweats, and unintended weight loss associated with Hodgkin and non-Hodgkin lymphomas. Patients with more advanced stages of lymphoma are more likely to be affected by these symptoms.

The presence of lymphoma outside the lymph nodes can cause a variety of symptoms depending on the affected organ. Extranodal involvement is common in non-Hodgkin lymphoma, with 40% of patients experiencing some form of it. Aggressive non-Hodgkin lymphomas make systemic symptoms more likely.

Mediastinal lymphadenopathy, and less commonly, pulmonary lymphoma, may cause cough, dyspnea, chest pain, or superior vena cava syndrome, due to compression of the windpipe, the superior vena cava, or nerves in the chest.

Lymphoma in bone marrow can cause anemia, thrombocytopenia, and fatigue. Bone marrow involvement is most common in low-grade, non-Hodgkin lymphomas, and especially in follicular, mantle cell, and small B-cell lymphomas (40-90% of cases depending on subtype).

Chronic pain, fullness, early satiety, and gastrointestinal bleeding are symptoms associated with gastrointestinal lymphoma. The gastrointestinal tract is the most common location for extranodal involvement with non-Hodgkin lymphomas, accounting for 30-40% of extranodal lymphomas in general, while in Hodgkin lymphomas, it is rare, accounting for less than 1% of cases.

Although uncommon, involvement with the central nervous system can cause symptoms including confusion, double vision, headaches, nausea, and hearing loss. It is rare in Hodgkin lymphomas, with only 0.2% to 0.5% of patients experiencing it, but occurs more often in non-Hodgkin lymphoma, ranging from 2.8% in indolent forms to 24.4% in high-grade lymphoblastic and Burkitt lymphoma.

Paraneoplastic syndromes are rare in lymphoma. Paraneoplastic cerebellar degeneration is most strongly associated with Hodgkin lymphomas, while polymyositis and dermatomyositis are associated with both Hodgkin and non-Hodgkin lymphomas.

== Diagnosis ==
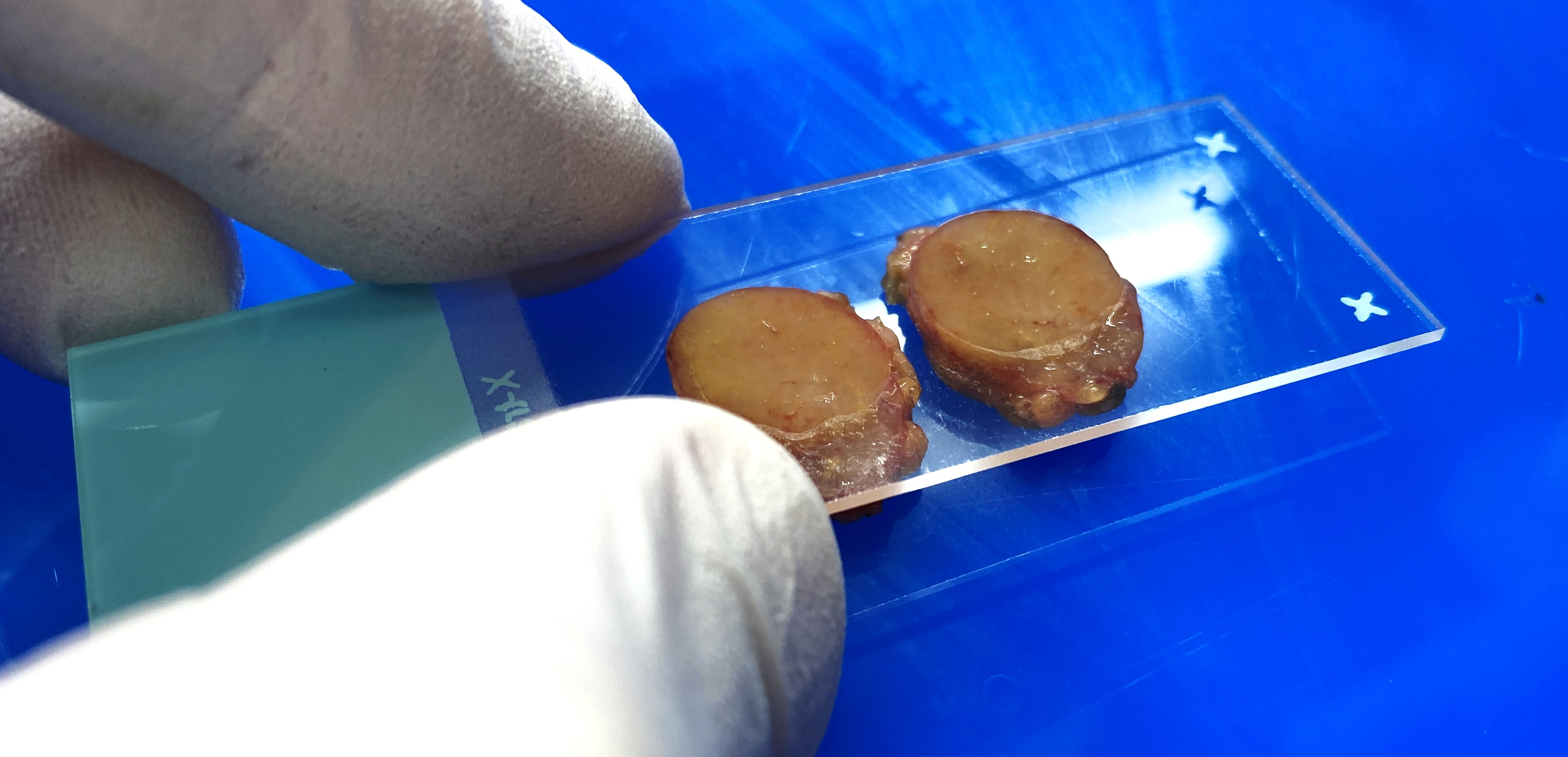
An initial evaluation of a suspected lymphoma is to make a "touch prep" wherein a glass slide is lightly pressed against excised lymphoid tissue, and subsequently stained (usually H&E stain) for evaluation under light microscopy.

Lymphoma is definitively diagnosed by a lymph-node biopsy or biopsy of extranodal tissue, which is examined under the microscope. This examination reveals histopathological features that may indicate lymphoma.

Imaging may be performed as part of the initial workup for lymphoma. CT scans can identify enlarged lymph nodes, while fluorodeoxyglucose (FDG) PET imaging identifies areas of increased lymph node activity.

Laboratory tests may also be used as part of initial workup to assess affected organ function, blood counts, and conditions that may affect treatment. Complete blood counts can show signs of bone marrow, spleen, and GI tract involvement through blood count abnormalities, including anemia, both low and high platelet count, and low white cell count.

Testing for HIV and hepatitis B and C may also be performed due HIV being associated with an increased risk for lymphoma and hepatitis potentially reactivating with certain antibody treatments.

After lymphoma is diagnosed, a variety of tests may be carried out to look for specific features characteristic of different types of lymphoma including immunophenotyping (targeting of proteins expressed on cells), flow cytometry, and fluorescence in situ hybridization testing.

=== Staging ===
Diagram showing common sites where lymphoma spreads

After a diagnosis and before treatment, cancer is staged. This refers to determining if the cancer has spread, and if so, whether locally or to distant sites. Staging is reported using a scale, from I (confined) to IV (spread). The stage of a lymphoma helps predict a patient's prognosis and is used to help select the appropriate therapy.

The Lugano classification system, a modified version of the older Ann Arbor staging system (from 1971), is the standard used for staging of both HL and NHL.

The specific criteria for each stage are as follows:

Lugano classification
Stage	Description
Limited stage
I (Note: 'E' suffix in stage I denotes a single extranodal lesion without nodal involvement; stage IIE describes disease contiguously expanding from ≥1 lymph node into local extranodal space.)	Single node or group of adjacent nodes
II (Note: Stage II bulky lymphoma is a subcategory corresponding to the 'X' suffix in Ann Arbor classification. The definition of bulky varies greatly depending on the lymphoma subtype.)	≥ 2 groups of nodes on one side of diaphragm
Advanced stage
III	Nodes on both sides of the diaphragm; or nodes above diaphragm with spleen involvement
IV	Diffuse or disseminated extranodal disease, with or without involvement of lymph nodes; or non-contiguous extranodal involvement in addition to stage II/III disease.

The presence of B symptoms (one or more of the following: unintentional loss of 10% body weight in the last 6 months, night sweats, or persistent fever of 38°C or more) or their absence is expressed with a B or A suffix, respectively. This modifier is only used with Hodgkin lymphoma patients, as correlation with prognosis was not found within cases of NHL.

FDG-PET/CT imaging is used for staging fluorodeoxyglucose-avid lymphomas, like Hodgkin lymphoma, while CT scans are used for non-FDG-avid lymphomas, which include some non-Hodgkin subtypes. In Hodgkin lymphoma and some non-Hodgkin lymphomas, like diffuse large B-cell lymphoma, PET/CT can replace bone marrow biopsy.

=== Differential diagnosis ===
A variety of infections and conditions can mimic lymphoma, owing to the diverse presentation of lymphoma subtypes, particularly within non-Hodgkin lymphomas. The differential diagnosis varies according to the type of lymphoma and the organs affected within the body.

==== Hodgkin lymphoma ====
Hodgkin lymphoma can resemble several other lymphoma subtypes and non-cancerous diseases, including:

- Diffuse large B-cell lymphoma
- Primary mediastinal B-cell lymphoma (sometimes called gray zone lymphoma when features overlap with classical HL)
- Peripheral T-cell lymphoma
- Anaplastic large cell lymphoma
- Infectious mononucleosis
- Hemophagocytic lymphohistiocytosis

==== Non-Hodgkin lymphoma ====
The differential diagnosis for non-Hodgkin lymphoma varies according to subtype and affected organs. Diseases that present similarly are often other lymphoid disorders, metastatic cancers, infections (especially in aggressive subtypes), and lymphoproliferative disorders, including:

- Hodgkin lymphoma
- Appendicitis and intussusception
- Toxoplasmosis
- Epstein-Barr viral infection
- Systemic lupus erythematosus
- Castleman disease, granulocytic sarcoma, or other lymphoproliferative disorders
- Metastases from primary tumors
- Bacterial infections, especially mycobacterial infections

Certain lymphomas (extranodal NK/T-cell lymphoma, nasal type and type II enteropathy-associated T-cell lymphoma) can be mimicked by two benign diseases that involve the excessive proliferation of nonmalignant NK cells in the GI tract, natural killer cell enteropathy, a disease wherein NK cell infiltrative lesions occur in the intestine, colon, stomach, or esophagus, and lymphomatoid gastropathy, a disease wherein these cells' infiltrative lesions are limited to the stomach. These diseases do not progress to cancer, may regress spontaneously, and do not respond to or require chemotherapy or other lymphoma treatments.

== Classification ==
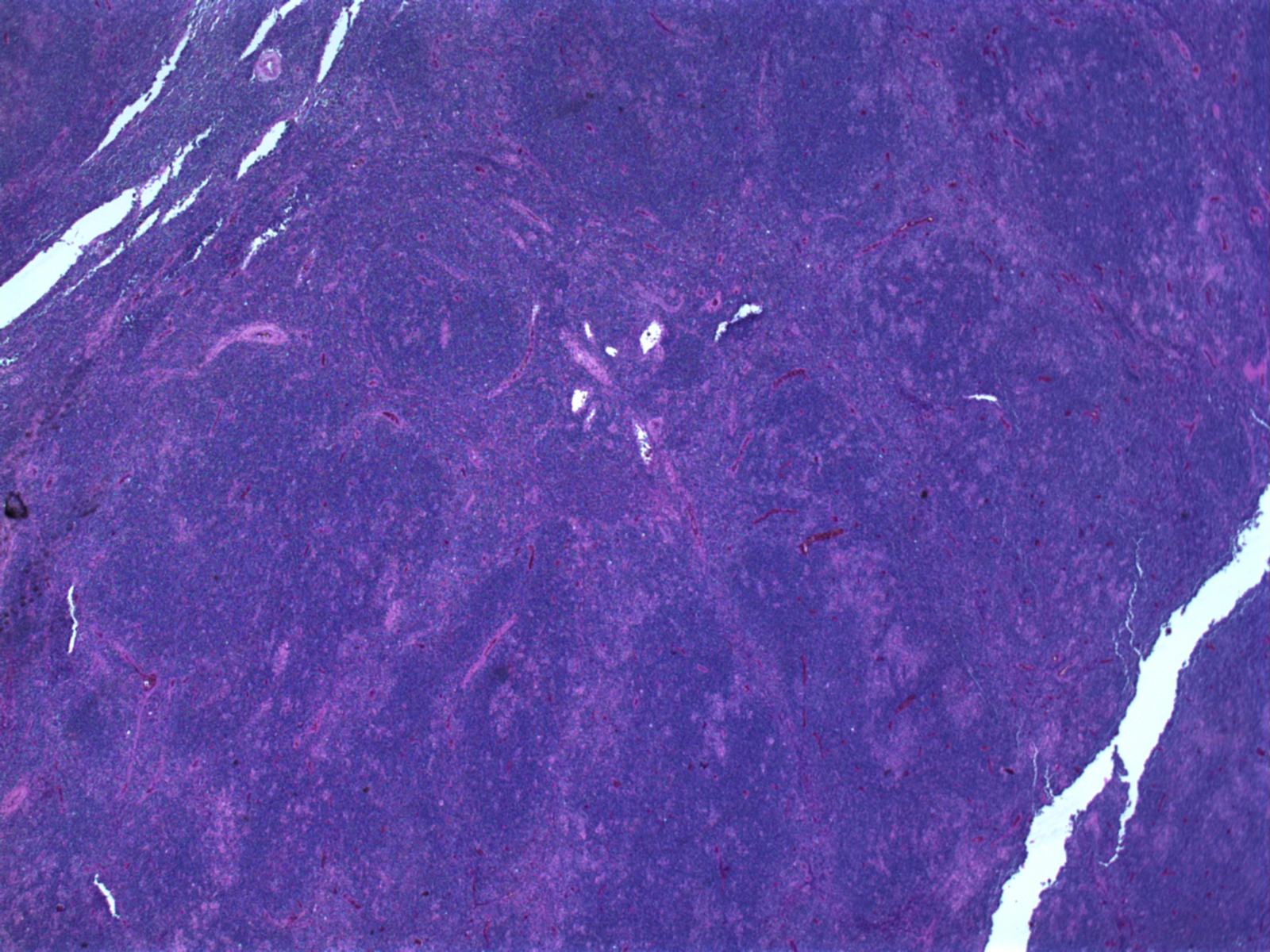
Lymph node with mantle cell lymphoma (low-power view, H&E)

According to the World Health Organization (WHO), lymphoma classification should reflect in which lymphocyte population the neoplasm arises. Thus, neoplasms that arise from precursor lymphoid cells are distinguished from those that arise from mature lymphoid cells. Most mature lymphoid neoplasms comprise the non-Hodgkin lymphomas. Because of their common involvement with lymphoid tissue, mature histiocytic and dendritic cell (HDC) neoplasms were historically discussed alongside mature lymphoid neoplasms, even though they are distinct in cellular origin.

Lymphoma can also spread to the central nervous system, often around the brain in the meninges, known as lymphomatous meningitis (LM).

=== Hodgkin lymphoma ===
Hodgkin lymphoma accounts for about 10% of lymphomas. It differs from other forms of lymphomas in its prognosis and several pathological characteristics. A division into Hodgkin and non-Hodgkin lymphomas is used in several of the older classification systems. A Hodgkin lymphoma is marked by the presence of a type of cell called the Reed–Sternberg cell.

=== Non-Hodgkin lymphomas ===
Non-Hodgkin lymphomas, which are defined as all lymphomas except Hodgkin lymphoma, are more common than Hodgkin lymphoma. A wide variety of lymphomas are in this class, and the causes, the types of cells involved, and the prognoses vary by type. The number of cases annually of non-Hodgkin lymphoma increases with age. It is further divided into several subtypes.

=== Epstein–Barr virus-associated lymphoproliferative diseases ===
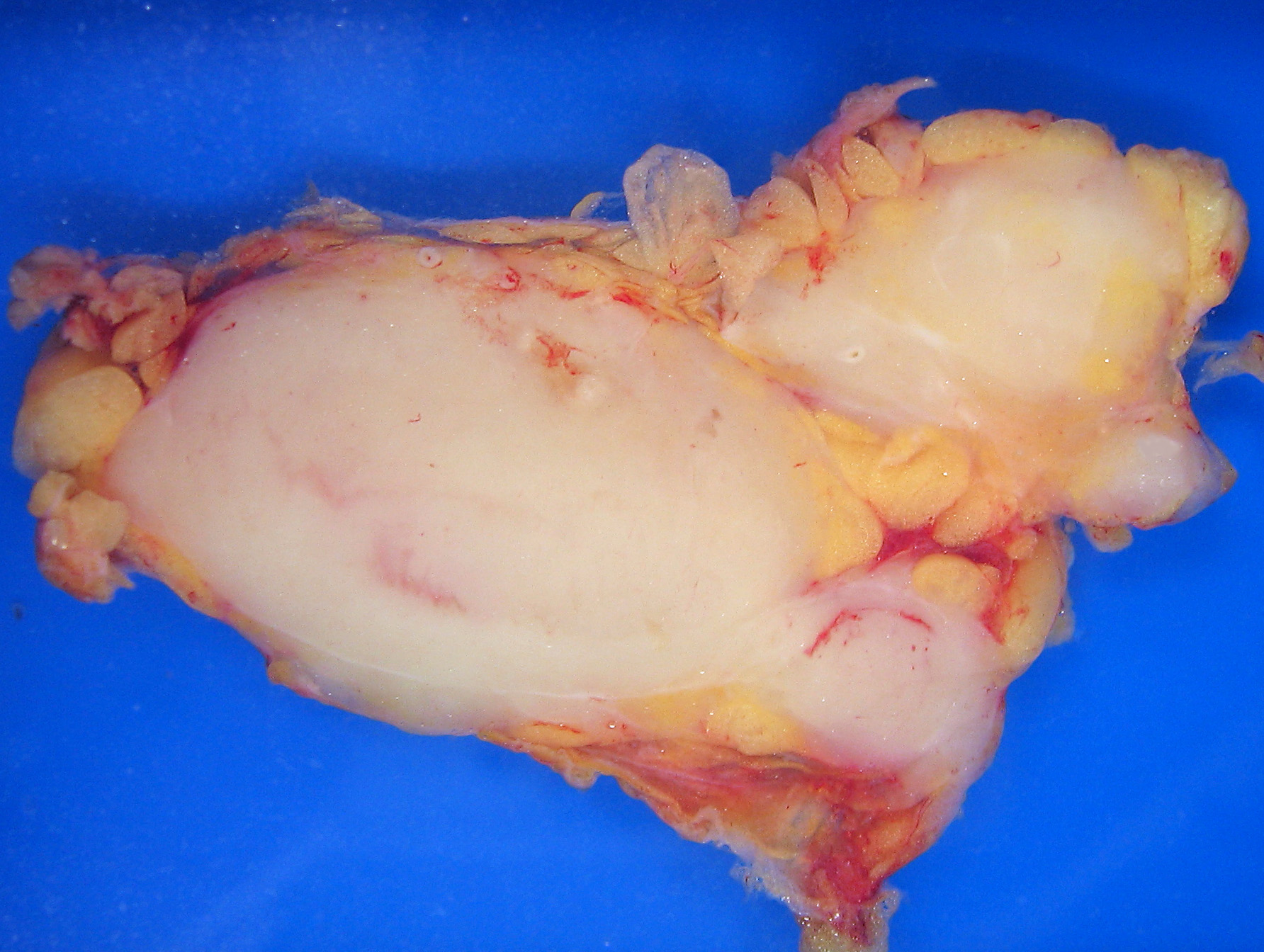
Follicular lymphoma replacing a lymph node

Epstein–Barr virus-associated lymphoproliferative diseases are a group of benign, premalignant, and malignant diseases of lymphoid cells (i.e., B cells, T cells, NK cells, and histiocytic-dendritic cells) in which one or more of these cell types is infected with the Epstein–Barr virus (EBV). The virus may be responsible for the development and/or progression of these diseases.

In addition to EBV-positive Hodgkin lymphomas, the World Health Organization (2016) includes the following lymphomas, when associated with EBV infection, in this group of diseases:

- Burkitt lymphoma
- large B cell lymphoma, not otherwise specified
- diffuse large B cell lymphoma associated with chronic inflammation
- fibrin-associated diffuse large B cell lymphoma; primary effusion lymphoma
- plasmablastic lymphoma
- extranodal NK/T cell lymphoma, nasal type
- peripheral T cell lymphoma, not otherwise specified
- angioimmunoblastic T-cell lymphoma
- follicular T cell lymphoma
- systemic T cell lymphoma of childhood.

=== WHO classification ===
The WHO classification, published in 2001 and updated in 2008, 2017, and 2022, is based upon the foundations laid within the "revised European–American lymphoma classification" (REAL). This system groups lymphomas by cell type (i.e., the normal cell type that most resembles the tumor) and defines phenotypic, molecular, or cytogenetic characteristics. The five groups are shown in the table. Hodgkin lymphoma is considered separately within the WHO and preceding classifications, although it is recognized as being a tumor, albeit markedly abnormal, of lymphocytes of mature B cell lineage.

Of the many forms of lymphoma, some are categorized as indolent (e.g., small lymphocytic lymphoma), compatible with a long life even without treatment. Other forms are aggressive (e.g., Burkitt's lymphoma), causing rapid deterioration and death. However, most of the aggressive lymphomas respond well to treatment and are curable. The prognosis, therefore, depends on the correct diagnosis and classification of the disease, which is established after examination of a biopsy by a pathologist (usually a hematopathologist).

Lymphoma subtypes (WHO 2008)
Mature B cell neoplasms

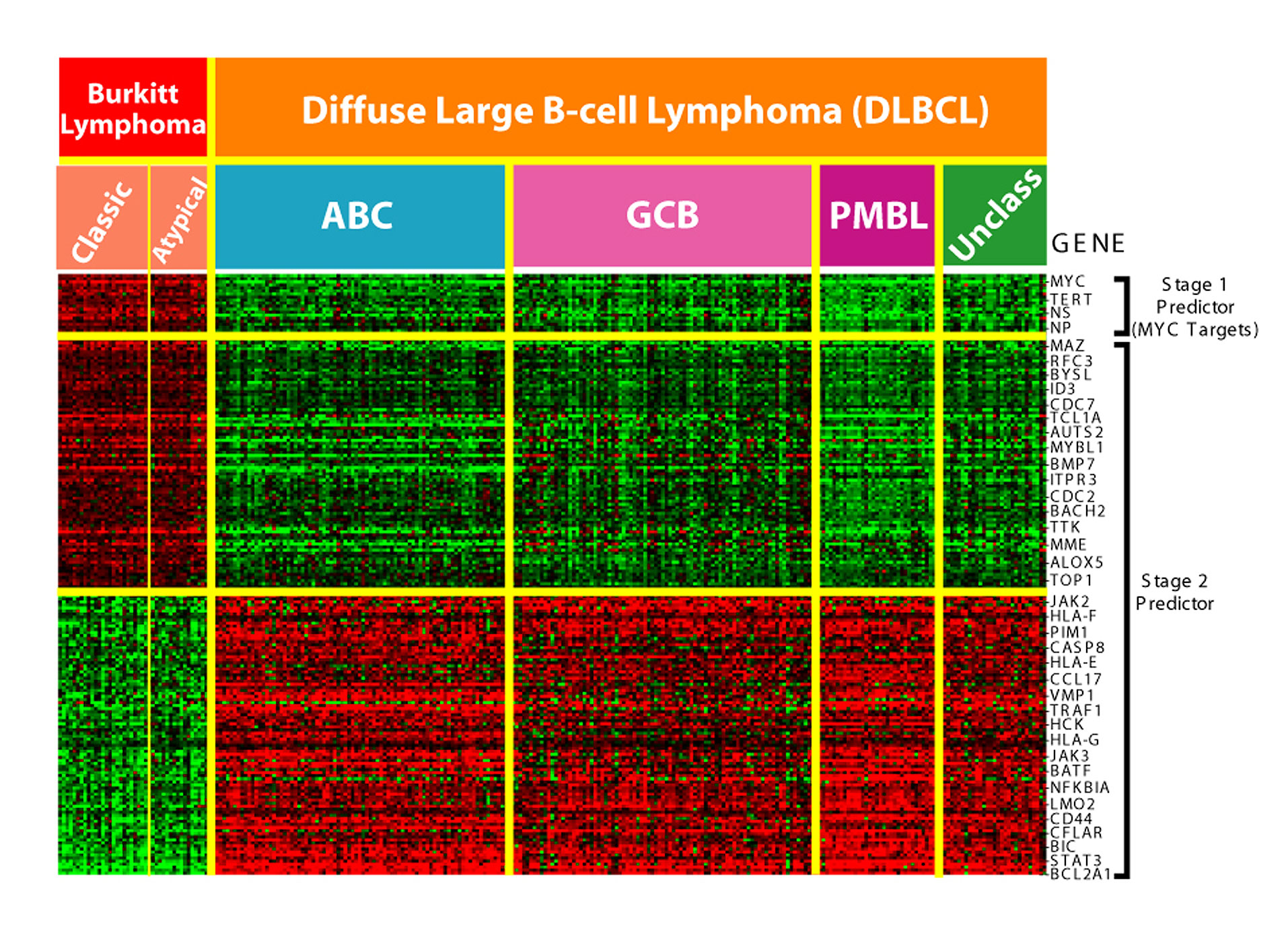
DNA-microarray analysis of Burkitt's lymphoma and diffuse large B-cell lymphoma (DLBCL) showing differences in gene expression patterns. Colors indicate levels of expression; green indicates genes that are underexpressed in lymphoma cells (as compared to normal cells), whereas red indicates genes that are overexpressed in lymphoma cells.

- B-cell chronic lymphocytic leukemia/small cell lymphoma

3–4% of lymphomas in adults
Small resting lymphocytes mixed with variable numbers of large activated cells, lymph nodes diffusely effaced
CD5, surface immunoglobulin
5-year survival rate 50%.
Occurs in older adults, usually involves lymph nodes, bone marrow, and spleen; most patients have peripheral blood involvement, indolent

- B-cell prolymphocytic leukemia
- Lymphoplasmacytic lymphoma (such as Waldenström macroglobulinemia)
- Splenic marginal zone lymphoma
- Hairy cell leukemia
- Plasma cell neoplasms:
  - Plasma cell myeloma (also known as multiple myeloma)
  - Plasmacytoma
  - Monoclonal immunoglobulin deposition diseases
  - Heavy chain diseases
- Extranodal marginal zone B cell lymphoma, also called MALT lymphoma

About 5% of lymphomas in adults
Variable cell size and differentiation, 40% show plasma cell differentiation, homing of B cells to epithelium creates lymphoepithelial lesions.
CD5, CD10, surface Ig
Frequently occurs outside lymph nodes, very indolent, may be cured by local excision

- Nodal marginal zone B cell lymphoma
- Follicular lymphoma

About 40% of lymphomas in adults
Small "cleaved" [cleft] cells (centrocytes) mixed with large activated cells (centroblasts), usually nodular ("follicular") growth pattern
CD10, surface Ig
About 72–77%
Occurs in older adults, usually involves lymph nodes, bone marrow, and spleen, associated with t(14;18) translocation overexpressing Bcl-2, indolent

- Primary cutaneous follicle center lymphoma
- Mantle cell lymphoma

About 3–4% of lymphomas in adults
Lymphocytes of small to intermediate size growing in a diffuse pattern
CD5
About 50 to 70%
Occurs mainly in adult males, usually involves lymph nodes, bone marrow, spleen, and GI tract, associated with t(11;14) translocation overexpressing cyclin D1, moderately aggressive

- Diffuse large B-cell lymphoma, not otherwise specified

About 40–50% of lymphomas in adults
Variable, most resemble B cells of large germinal centers, diffuse growth pattern
Variable expression of CD10 and surface Ig
Five-year survival rate 60%
Occurs in all ages, but most commonly in older adults, may occur outside lymph nodes, aggressive

- Diffuse large B-cell lymphoma associated with chronic inflammation
- Epstein–Barr virus positive diffuse large B-cell lymphoma, not otherwise specified
- Lymphomatoid granulomatosis
- Primary mediastinal (thymic) large B-cell lymphoma
- Intravascular large B-cell lymphoma
- ALK+ large B-cell lymphoma
- Plasmablastic lymphoma
- Primary effusion lymphoma
- Large B-cell lymphoma arising in HHV8-associated multicentric Castleman's disease
- Burkitt lymphoma/leukemia

< 1% of lymphomas in the United States
Round lymphoid cells of intermediate size with several nucleoli, starry-sky appearance by diffuse spread with interspersed apoptosis
CD10, surface Ig
Five-year survival rate 50%
Endemic in Africa, sporadic elsewhere, more common in immunocompromised and children, often visceral involvement, highly aggressive

Mature T cell and natural killer (NK) cell neoplasms
- T-cell prolymphocytic leukemia
- T-cell large granular lymphocyte leukemia
- Aggressive NK cell leukemia
- Adult T-cell leukemia/lymphoma
- Extranodal NK/T-cell lymphoma, nasal type
- Enteropathy-associated T-cell lymphoma
- Hepatosplenic T-cell lymphoma
- Blastic NK cell lymphoma
- Mycosis fungoides/Sézary syndrome

Most common cutaneous lymphoid malignancy
Usually small lymphoid cells with convoluted nuclei that often infiltrate the epidermis, creating Pautrier microabscesseses
CD4
5-year survival 75%
Localized or more generalized skin symptoms, generally indolent, in a more aggressive variant, Sézary's disease, skin erythema and peripheral blood involvement

- Primary cutaneous CD30-positive T-cell lymphoproliferative disorders
  - Primary cutaneous anaplastic large cell lymphoma
  - Lymphomatoid papulosis
- Peripheral T-cell lymphoma not otherwise specified

Most common T cell lymphoma
Variable, usually a mix of small to large lymphoid cells with irregular nuclear contours
CD3
Probably consists of several rare tumor types, often disseminated and generally aggressive

- Angioimmunoblastic T-cell lymphoma
- Anaplastic large cell lymphoma: ALK-positive and ALK-negative types
- Breast plant-associated anaplastic large cell lymphoma
Precursor lymphoid neoplasms
- B-lymphoblastic leukemia/lymphoma not otherwise specified
- B-lymphoblastic leukemia/lymphoma with recurrent genetic abnormalities
- T-lymphoblastic leukemia/lymphoma

15% of childhood acute lymphoblastic leukemia and 90% of lymphoblastic lymphoma.
Lymphoblasts with irregular nuclear contours, condensed chromatin, small nucleoli, and scant cytoplasm without granules
TdT, CD2, CD7
It often presents as a mediastinal mass because of involvement of the thymus. It is highly associated with NOTCH1 mutations, and is most common in adolescent males.

Hodgkin lymphoma
- Classical Hodgkin lymphomas:
  - Nodular sclerosis form of Hodgkin lymphoma

Most common type of Hodgkin lymphoma
Reed–Sternberg cell variants and inflammation, usually broad sclerotic bands that consist of collagen
CD15, CD30
Most common in young adults, often arises in the mediastinum or cervical lymph nodes

  - Mixed cellularity Hodgkin lymphoma

Second-most common form of Hodgkin lymphoma
Many classic Reed–Sternberg cells and inflammation
CD15, CD30
Most common in men, more likely to be diagnosed at advanced stages than the nodular sclerosis form Epstein–Barr virus involved in 70% of cases

  - Lymphocyte-rich
  - Lymphocyte-depleted or not-depleted
- Nodular lymphocyte-predominant Hodgkin lymphoma
Immunodeficiency-associated lymphoproliferative disorders
- Associated with a primary immune disorder
- Associated with the human immunodeficiency virus (HIV)
- Post-transplant
- Associated with methotrexate therapy
- Primary central nervous system lymphoma occurs most often in immunocompromised patients, in particular those with AIDS, but it can occur in the immunocompetent, as well. It has a poor prognosis, particularly in those with AIDS. Treatment can consist of corticosteroids, radiotherapy, and chemotherapy, often with methotrexate.

=== Previous classifications ===
Several previous classifications have been used, including Rappaport, Lennert/Kiel, BNLI, Working Formulation, and REAL.

The Working Formulation of 1982 was a classification of non-Hodgkin lymphoma. It excluded the Hodgkin lymphomas and divided the remaining lymphomas into four grades (low, intermediate, high, and miscellaneous) related to prognosis, with some further subdivisions based on the size and shape of affected cells. This purely histological classification included no information about cell surface markers or genetics and made no distinction between T-cell lymphomas and B-cell lymphomas. It was widely accepted at the time of its publication, but by 2004, it was obsolete.

In 1994, the Revised European-American Lymphoma (REAL) classification applied immunophenotypic and genetic features to identify distinct clinicopathologic entities among all the lymphomas except Hodgkin lymphoma. For coding purposes, the ICD-O (codes 9590–9999) and ICD-10 (codes C81-C96) are available.

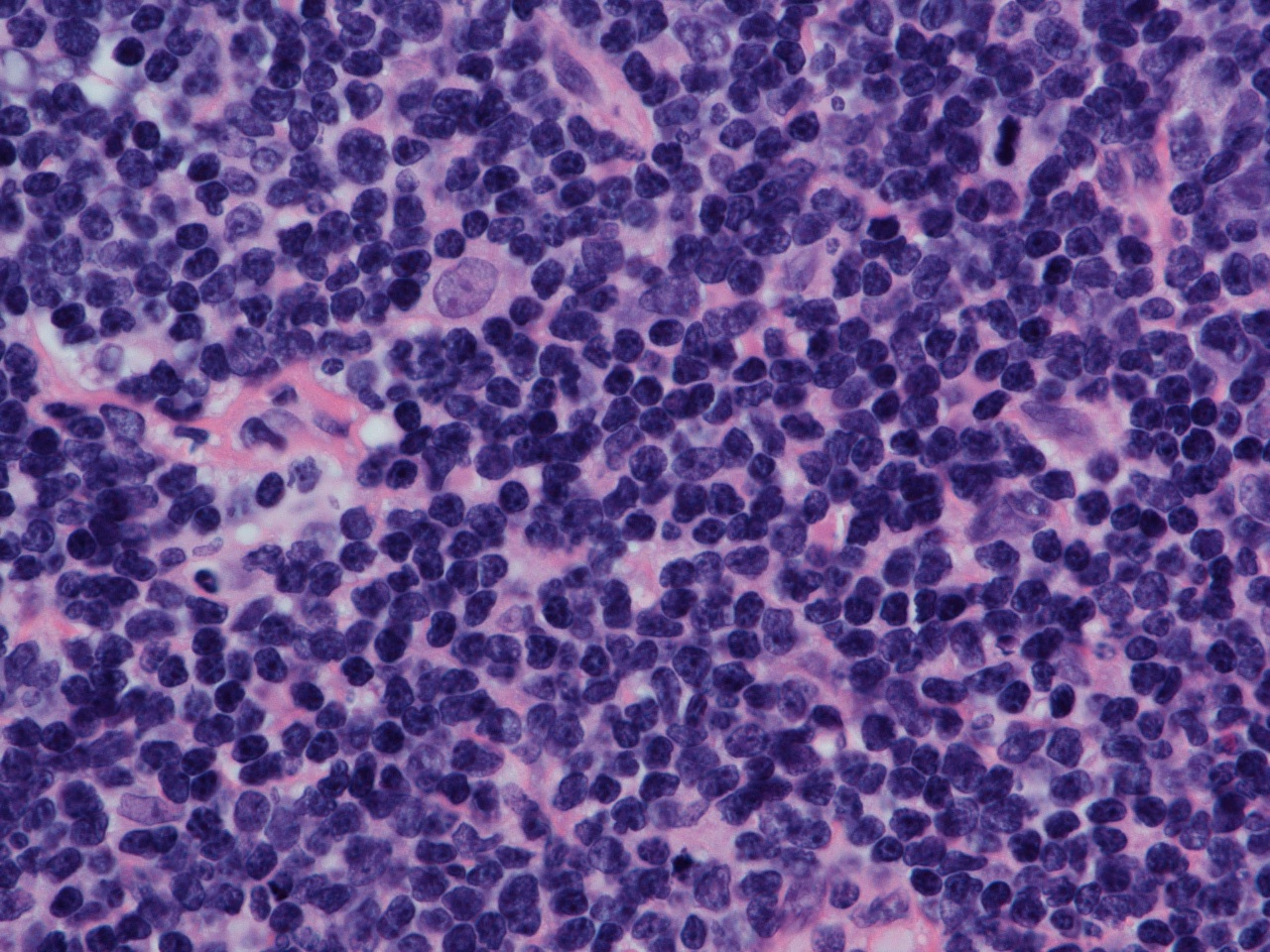
Mantle cell lymphoma: Notice the irregular nuclear contours of the medium-sized lymphoma cells and the presence of a pink histiocyte. By immunohistochemistry, the lymphoma cells expressed CD20, CD5, and Cyclin D1 (high-power view, H&E).

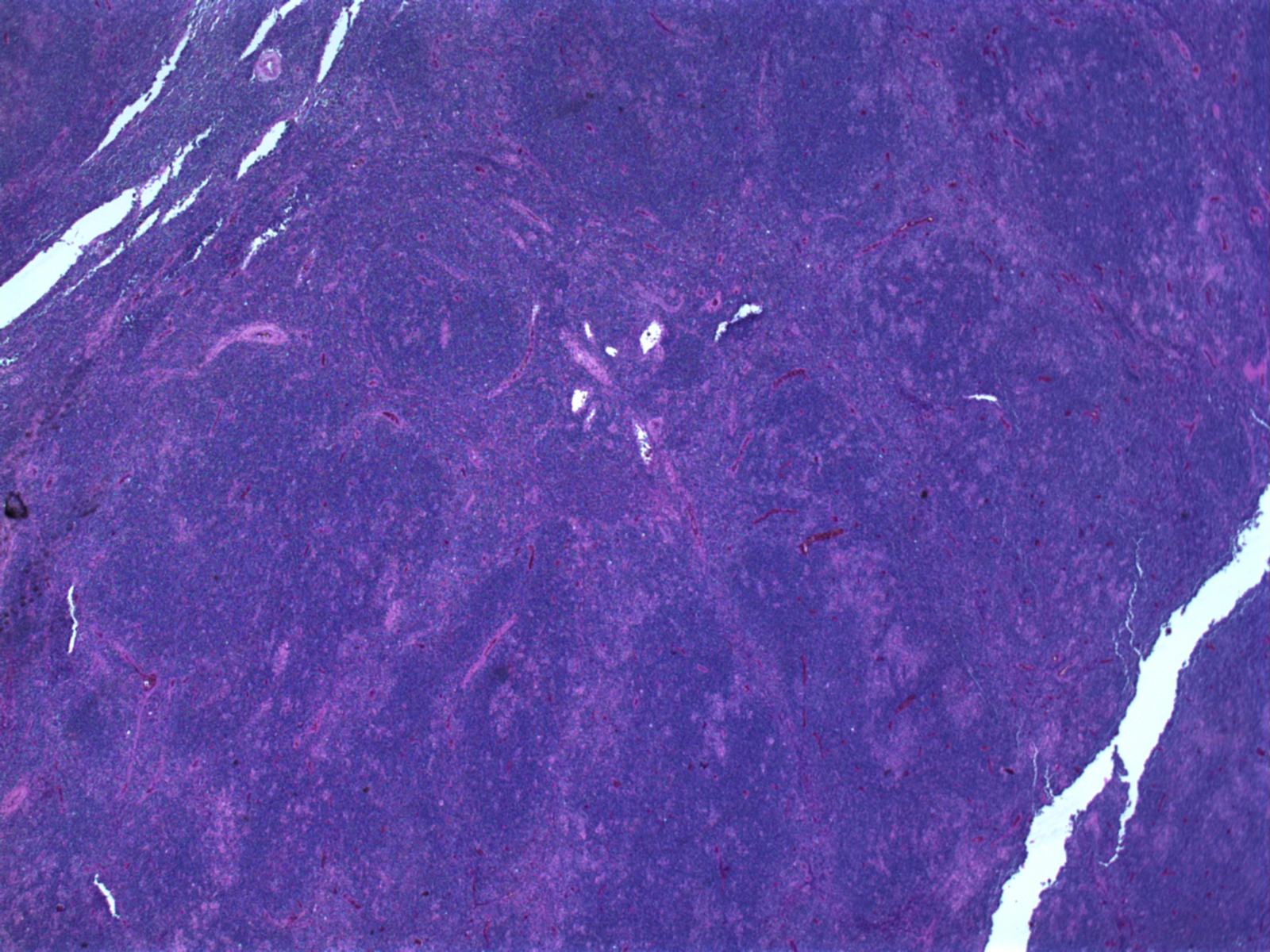
Hodgkin lymphoma, nodular lymphocyte predominant (low-power view): Notice the nodular architecture and the areas of "mottling" (H&E).

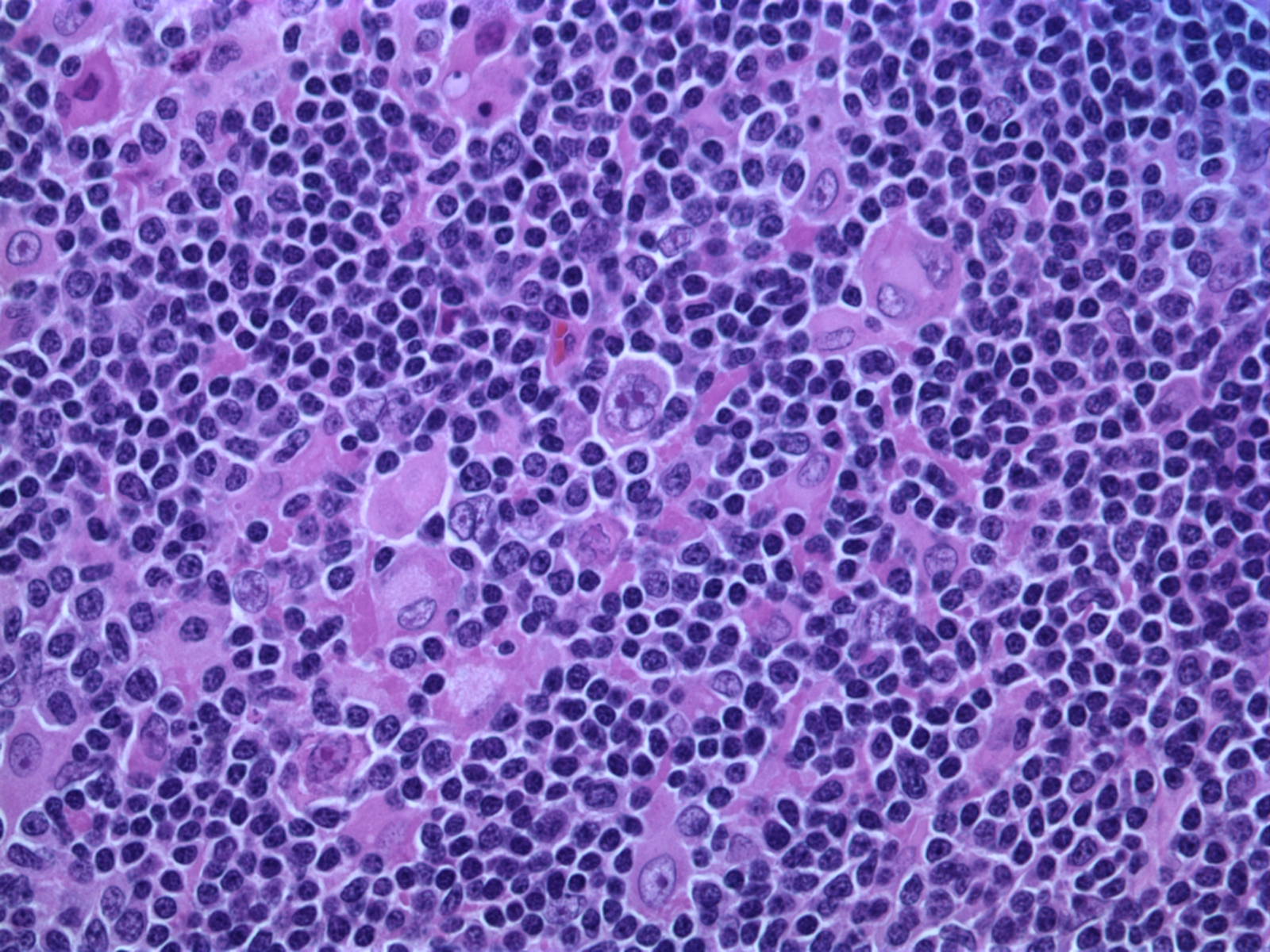
Hodgkin lymphoma, nodular lymphocyte predominant (high-power view): Notice the presence of L&H cells, also known as "popcorn cells" (H&E).

== Treatment ==
The treatment of lymphoma changes according to disease subtype, staging, anatomical distribution, and patient factors like age, symptoms, and performance status. For aggressive Hodgkin and non-Hodgkin lymphomas, treatment is often administered with the intent to cure, while treatment for slow-growing non-Hodgkin lymphomas involves more watchful waiting and symptom alleviation.

Treatment may involve a combination of methods, including chemotherapy, radiation therapy, immunotherapy, targeted therapy, hematopoietic stem-cell transplants, or watchful waiting. Advancements in diagnostics have allowed more individual treatment based on lymphoma subtype and patient circumstances.

=== Hodgkin lymphoma ===
The management of Hodgkin lymphoma differs from non-Hodgkin subtypes due to its predictable pattern of spreading through the lymphatic system and the presence of Reed-Sternberg cells. The disease is responsive to treatment, with 5-year survival rates exceeding 80% across all stages.

==== Early-stage disease ====
Early-stage (I-II) classical Hodgkin lymphoma is generally treated with chemotherapy, commonly using ABVD, paired with involved-site radiotherapy, a radiotherapy technique where only areas directly affected by disease are targeted instead of entire anatomical regions. Increasingly, PET imaging has been used to adapt regimens based on the patient's response to treatment, allowing for a transition to BEACOPP or other treatments in unfavourable progression. Classifying patients based on initial risk has also been used to make modifications in treatment.

==== Late-stage disease ====
Treatments for advanced-stage (III-IV) Hodgkin lymphoma have gone through significant development since the late 2010s, with the standard of care expanding from ABVD to include therapies incorporating brentuximab vedotin, an antibody-drug conjugate that targets CD30 proteins expressed on Reed-Sternberg cells, combined with doxorubicin, vinblastine, and dacarbazine (BV-AVD). Following its 2026 FDA approval, nivolumab, an immune checkpoint inhibitor that promotes T-cell anti-tumor activity by targeting the PD-1 receptor, has been used in first-line treatment with the same chemotherapy regimen (N-AVD).

==== Refractory or relapsed disease ====
Patients with refractory or relapsed Hodgkin lymphoma are often treated with salvage chemotherapy followed by hematopoietic stem-cell transplantation, with around 50% of relapsed patients being cured. In patients where relapse occurs after stem-cell transplantation, brentuximab vedotin and PD-1 inhibitors are viable options for treatment, and have been shown to reduce relapse risk.

=== Non-Hodgkin lymphoma ===
Non-Hodgkin lymphoma encompasses over 80 distinct diseases, with treatments varying according to subtype and clinical behaviour, broadly divided into indolent and aggressive lymphomas. Outcomes of treatment are varied, with 5-year overall survival ranging from 60-90% depending on patient risk and subtype of lymphoma.

==== Aggressive disease ====
Aggressive B-cell lymphomas, like diffuse large B-cell lymphoma (DLBCL) and high-grade B-cell lymphoma, are typically treated with combination chemotherapy, with the goal of complete cure. The most common regimen is rituximab, an immunotherapy that targets the CD20 protein expressed on B-cells, combined with CHOP chemotherapy (R-CHOP), which has been the first-line standard for over 20 years.

Polatuzumab vedotin, an antibody-drug conjugate that targets the CD79b protein on B-cells to deliver monomethyl auristatin E, was introduced as an alternative to R-CHOP following FDA approval in 2023, through the Pola-R-CHP regimen, where it replaces the mitotic inhibitor, vincristine (Oncovin).

==== Indolent disease ====
Localised indolent lymphomas, especially stage I follicular lymphoma, may be treated with involved-site radiotherapy, with the intent to cure. 5-year overall survival for both early-stage follicular and marginal zone lymphoma treated with radiotherapy have been reported to exceed 85%. Rituximab, both with and without chemotherapy, is also an accepted alternative for patients where radiotherapy is unavailable as a treatment.

Contrary to localised disease, advanced-stage indolent lymphomas are often treated with watchful waiting when patients are asymptomatic and have a low tumour burden, as early treatment has not been shown to improve overall survival. Treatment is indicated following development of symptoms or high tumor burden.

When initiated, standard treatment includes rituximab with bendamustine, an alkylating chemotherapeutic agent with DNA-damaging properties, however, combinations of rituximab and other chemotherapies are used as well.

In other lymphomas, like chronic lymphocytic leukemia/small lymphocytic lymphoma (CLL/SLL), Bruton's tyrosine kinase (BTK) inhibitors, a targeted therapy that prevents B-cells from growing by blocking B-cell receptor signalling, are widely used as standard chemotherapy-free treatments.

==== Relapsed or refractory disease ====
With the advent of targeted therapy and immunotherapy-based treatments, treatment of relapsed and refractory non-Hodgkin lymphoma has increasingly incorporated modalities beyond salvage chemotherapy and stem-cell transplantation.

Chimeric antigen receptor-modified (CAR) T-cell therapy has become part of the standard of care in refractory B-cell lymphomas, where, through the genetic modification of patient T-cells, CD19 proteins on B cells are targeted to release cytotoxins in tumor cells. Remission rates have improved with the introduction of CAR T-cell therapy, with 31% of patients remaining progression-free at 5 years and a complete remission rate of 59% in comparison to 40% complete remission and 25% progression-free survival rate with prior treatments.

Bispecific antibodies, an immunotherapy that binds to two proteins simultaneously (CD20 on lymphoma cells, CD3 on T-cells) to direct T cells to target B cells, have also demonstrated efficacy in relapsed diffuse large B-cell lymphoma and follicular lymphoma and provided alternative treatment options for patients, including those ineligible for CAR-T therapy. Response rates range from 25-40% in diffuse large B-cell lymphoma, and 60-75% in follicular lymphoma.

For refractory or relapsed mantle cell lymphoma, BCL-2 inhibitors, like venetoclax, and BTK inhibitors block signalling pathways, inducing apoptosis with a 21% complete response rate.

=== Palliative care ===
Palliative care, a specialized medical care focused on the symptoms, pain, and stress of a serious illness, is recommended by multiple national cancer treatment guidelines as an accompaniment to curative treatments for people with lymphoma. It is used to address both the direct symptoms of lymphoma and many unwanted side effects that arise from treatments. Palliative care can be especially helpful for children who develop lymphoma, helping both children and their families deal with the physical and emotional symptoms of the disease. For these reasons, palliative care is especially important for people requiring bone marrow transplants.

=== Supportive treatment ===
Adding physical exercises to the standard treatment for adult patients with haematological malignancies like lymphomas may result in little to no difference in mortality, quality of life, and physical functioning. These exercises may result in a slight reduction in depression. Furthermore, aerobic physical exercises probably reduce fatigue. The evidence is very uncertain about the effect on anxiety and serious adverse events.

== Prognosis ==
Five-year relative survival by stage at diagnosis
Stage at diagnosis	Five-year relative survival (%)	Percentage of cases (%)
Localized (confined to primary site)	82.3	26
Regional (spread to regional lymph nodes)	78.3	19
Distant (cancer has metastasized)	62.7	47
Unknown (unstaged)	68.6	8

== Epidemiology ==
Deaths from lymphomas and multiple myeloma per million persons in 2012: 0–13 14–18 19–22 23–28 29–34 35–42 43–57 58–88 89–121 122–184

Between 1990 and 2021, Lymphoma was the most common form of hematological malignancy, or "blood cancer", in the developed world.

Taken together, lymphomas represent 5.3% of all cancers (excluding simple basal cell and squamous cell skin cancers) in the United States and 55.6% of all blood cancers.

According to the U.S. National Institutes of Health, lymphomas account for about 5%, and Hodgkin lymphoma in particular accounts for less than 1% of all cases of cancer in the United States.

Because the whole lymphatic system is part of the body's immune system, people with a weakened immune system, such as from HIV infection or certain drugs or medications, also have a higher number of cases of lymphoma.

== History ==
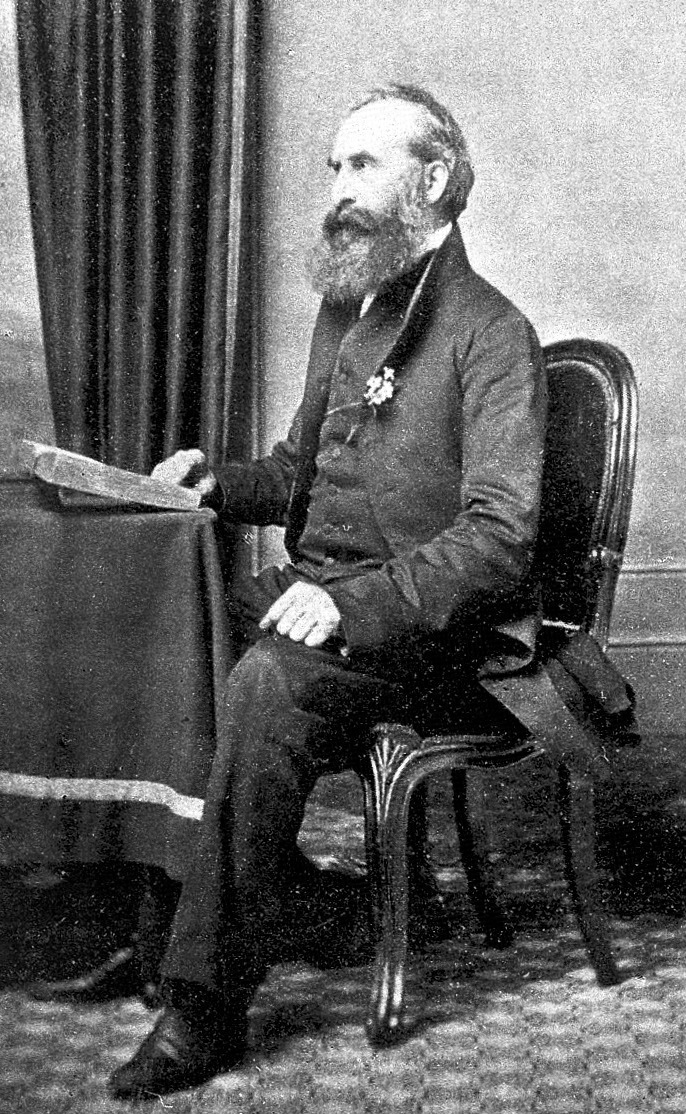
Thomas Hodgkin

Thomas Hodgkin published the first description of lymphoma in 1832, specifically of the form named after him. Since then, many 70 other types of lymphoma have been described based on the range of their activity.

=== Etymology ===
The term "lymphoma" is from Latin lympha ("water") and from Greek -oma ("morbid growth, tumor").

== Research ==
The two types of lymphoma research are clinical or translational research and basic research. Clinical/translational research focuses on studying the disease in a defined and generally immediately applicable way, such as testing a new drug in people. Studies may focus on effective means of treatment, better ways of treating the disease, improving the quality of life for people, or appropriate care in remission or after cures. Hundreds of clinical trials are being planned or conducted at any given time.

Basic science research studies the disease process at a distance, such as seeing whether a suspected carcinogen can cause healthy cells to turn into lymphoma cells in the laboratory or how the DNA changes inside lymphoma cells as the disease progresses. The results from basic research studies are generally less immediately useful to people with the disease, but can improve scientists' understanding of lymphoma and form the foundation for future, more effective treatments.

== Further readings ==
- Campo, E., Harris, N. L., Jaffe, E. S., Pileri, S. A., Stein, H., Thiele, J., & Vardiman, J. W. (2008). WHO classification of tumours of haematopoietic and lymphoid tissues (Vol. 2, p. 439). S. H. Swerdlow (Ed.). Lyon, France: International agency for research on cancer.
