= B-cell lymphoma =

Blood cancer that affects B-type white blood cells

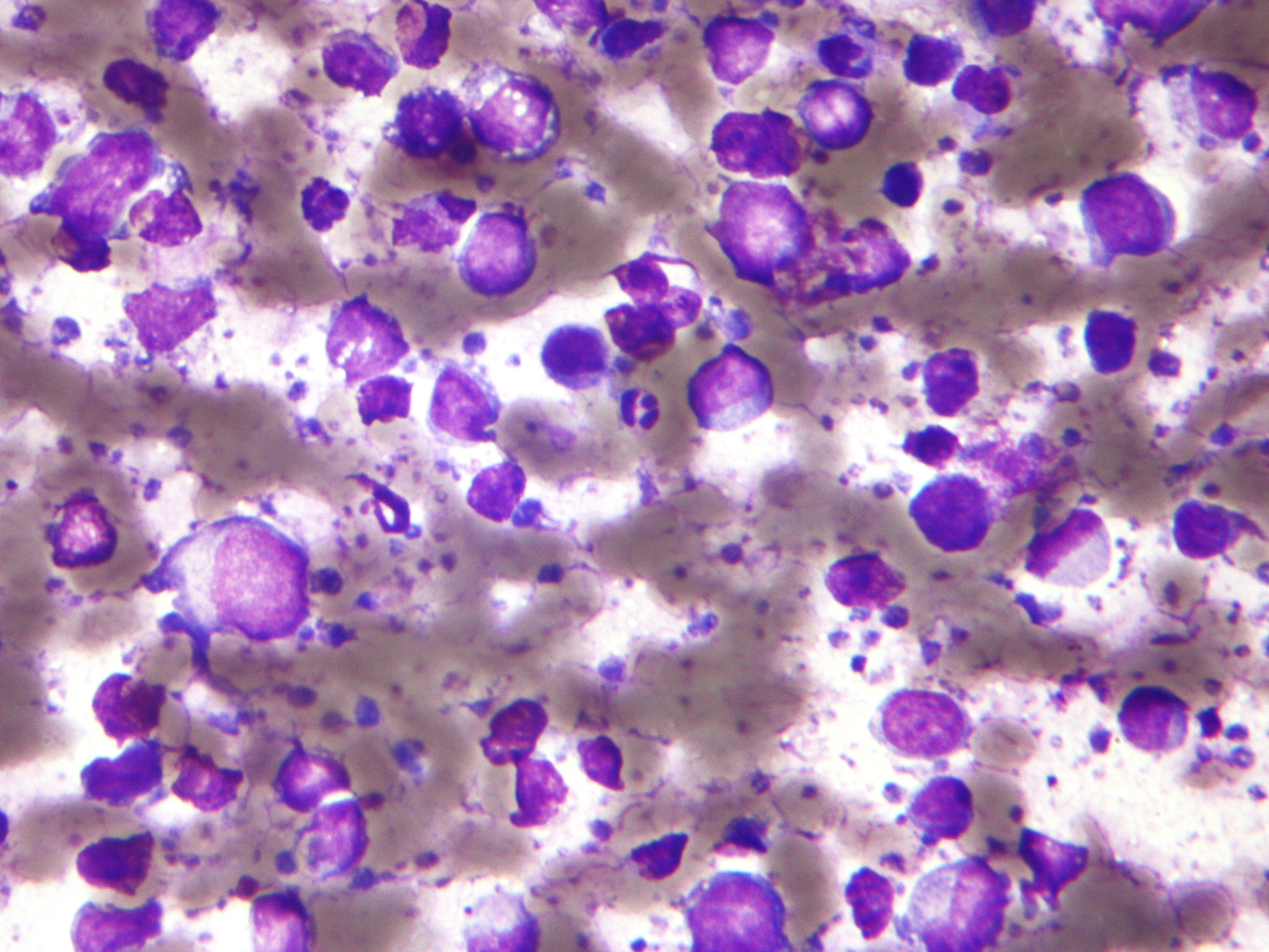
- Micrograph showing a large B cell lymphoma. Field stain.
- Specialty: Hematology, oncology

The B-cell lymphomas are types of lymphoma affecting B cells. Lymphomas are "blood cancers" in the lymph nodes. They develop more frequently in older adults and in immunocompromised individuals.

B-cell lymphomas include both Hodgkin's lymphomas and most non-Hodgkin lymphomas. They are typically divided into low and high grade, typically corresponding to indolent (slow-growing) lymphomas and aggressive lymphomas, respectively. As a generalisation, indolent lymphomas respond to treatment and are kept under control (in remission) with long-term survival of many years, but are not cured. Aggressive lymphomas usually require intensive treatments, with some having a good prospect for a permanent cure.

Prognosis and treatment depends on the specific type of lymphoma as well as the stage and grade. Treatment includes radiation and chemotherapy. Early-stage indolent B-cell lymphomas can often be treated with radiation alone, with long-term non-recurrence. Early-stage aggressive disease is treated with chemotherapy and often radiation, with a 70–90% cure rate. Late-stage indolent lymphomas are sometimes left untreated and monitored until they progress. Late-stage aggressive disease is treated with chemotherapy, with cure rates of over 70%.

== Types ==
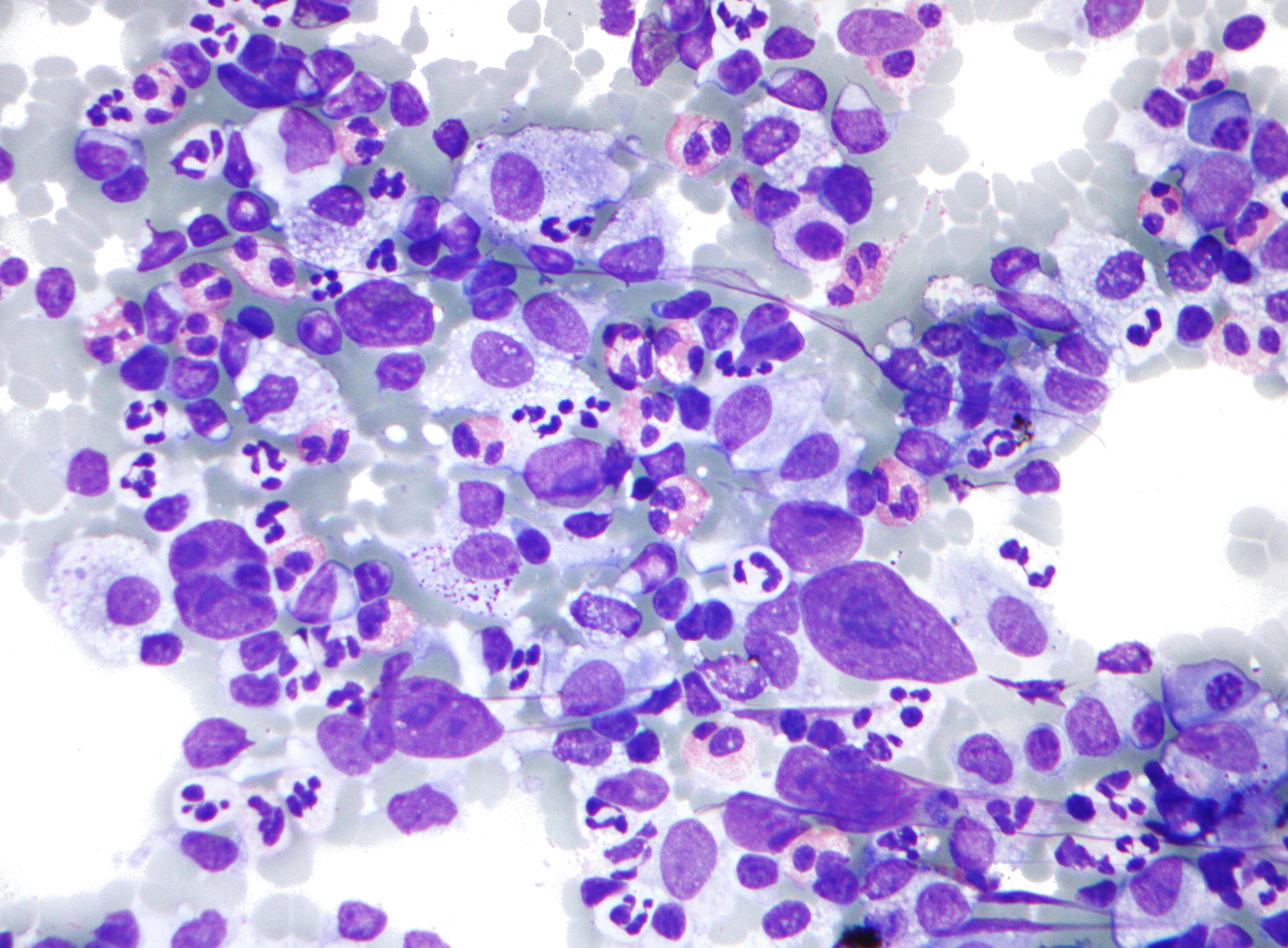
Micrograph showing Hodgkin's lymphoma, a type of B cell lymphoma that is usually considered separate from other B cell lymphomas. Field stain.

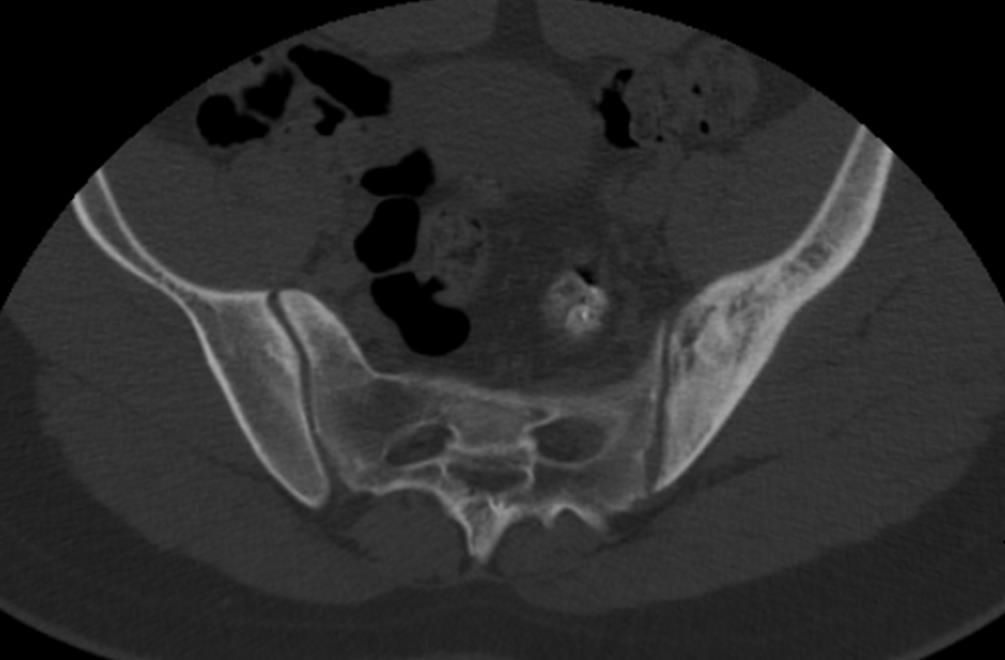
CT scan of primary B cell lymphoma in the left ilium, as diffuse cortical and trabecular thickening of the hemipelvis, mimicking Paget's disease.

There are numerous kinds of lymphomas involving B cells. The most commonly used classification system is the WHO classification, a convergence of more than one, older classification systems.

=== Common ===
Five account for nearly three out of four patients with non-Hodgkin lymphoma:

- Diffuse large B-cell lymphoma (DLBCL)
- Follicular lymphoma
- Marginal zone B-cell lymphoma (MZL) or mucosa-associated lymphatic tissue lymphoma (MALT)
- Small lymphocytic lymphoma (SLL, also known as chronic lymphocytic leukemia, CLL)
- Mantle cell lymphoma (MCL)

=== Rare ===
The remaining forms are much less common:

- DLBCL variants or sub-types of
  - Primary mediastinal B-cell lymphoma
  - T cell/histiocyte-rich large B-cell lymphoma
  - Primary cutaneous diffuse large B-cell lymphoma, leg type (Primary cutaneous DLBCL, leg type)
  - EBV positive diffuse large B-cell lymphoma of the elderly
  - Diffuse large B-cell lymphoma associated with chronic inflammation
  - Fibrin-associated diffuse large B-cell lymphoma
  - Primary testicular diffuse large B-cell lymphoma
- Burkitt's lymphoma
- Lymphoplasmacytic lymphoma, which may manifest as Waldenström's macroglobulinemia
- Nodal marginal zone B cell lymphoma (NMZL)
- Splenic marginal zone lymphoma (SMZL)
- Intravascular lymphomas variants
  - Intravascular large B-cell lymphoma
  - Intravascular NK-cell lymphoma
  - Intravascular T-cell lymphoma
- Primary effusion lymphoma
- Lymphomatoid granulomatosis
- Primary central nervous system lymphoma
- ALK+ large B-cell lymphoma
- Plasmablastic lymphoma
- Large B-cell lymphoma arising in HHV8-associated multicentric Castleman's disease
- B-cell lymphoma, unclassifiable with features intermediate between diffuse large B-cell lymphoma and Burkitt lymphoma
- B-cell lymphoma, unclassifiable with features intermediate between diffuse large B-cell lymphoma and classical Hodgkin lymphoma

=== Other ===
Additionally, some researchers separate out lymphomas that appear to result from other immune system disorders, such as AIDS-related lymphoma.

Classic Hodgkin's lymphoma and nodular lymphocyte predominant Hodgkin's lymphoma are now considered forms of B-cell lymphoma.

== Diagnosis ==
When a person appears to have a B-cell lymphoma, the main components of a workup (for determining the appropriate therapy and the person's prognosis) are:

- Establishing the precise subtype: Initially, an incisional or excisional biopsy is preferred. A core needle biopsy is discouraged except in case a lymph node is not easily accessible. Fine-needle aspiration is only acceptable in selected circumstances, in combination with immunohistochemistry and flow cytometry.
- Determining the extent of the disease (localized or advanced; nodal or extranodal)
- The person's general health status.

Main immunohistochemistry markers in common types of B-cell lymphoma.
	Follicular lymphoma	Marginal zone B-cell lymphoma (MZL) or mucosa-associated lymphatic tissue (MALT) lymphoma	Small lymphocytic lymphoma (SLL) / chronic lymphocytic leukemia (CLL)	Mantle cell lymphoma (MCL)
CD5	-	-	+	+
CD10	+	-	-	-
CD23	-	-	+	-
Cyclin D1	-	-	-	+

Immunohistochemistry of kappa (κ, left) and lambda (λ, right) immunoglobulin light chains in normal tonsil control tissue, with an approximate κ:λ ratio of 2:1 in the displayed fields, which is normal. An abnormal predominance of one light chain (light-chain restriction) can support a clonal B-cell proliferation, including B-cell lymphoma.

== Associated chromosomal translocations ==
Chromosomal translocations involving the immunoglobulin heavy locus is a classic cytogenetic abnormality for many B-cell lymphomas, including follicular lymphoma, mantle cell lymphoma and Burkitt's lymphoma. In these cases, the immunoglobulin heavy locus forms a fusion protein with another protein that has pro-proliferative or anti-apoptotic abilities. The enhancer element of the immunoglobulin heavy locus, which normally functions to make B cells produce massive production of antibodies, now induces massive transcription of the fusion protein, resulting in excessive pro-proliferative or anti-apoptotic effects on the B cells containing the fusion protein.

In Burkitt's lymphoma and mantle cell lymphoma, the other protein in the fusion is c-myc (on chromosome 8) and cyclin D1 (on chromosome 11), respectively, which gives the fusion protein pro-proliferative ability. In follicular lymphoma, the fused protein is Bcl-2 (on chromosome 18), which gives the fusion protein anti-apoptotic abilities.

== See also ==
- Richter's transformation
- T-cell lymphoma
