= T cell/histiocyte-rich large B-cell lymphoma =

T-cell/histiocyte-rich large B-cell lymphoma
- Other names: THRLBCL
- Specialty: Hematology, Oncology,
- Differential diagnosis: Variant form of nodular lymphocyte predominant Hodgkin lymphoma

T-cell/histiocyte-rich large B-cell lymphoma (THRLBCL) is a malignancy of B cells. B-cells are lymphocytes that normally function in the humoral immunity component of the adaptive immune system by secreting antibodies that, for example, bind to and neutralize invasive pathogens. Among the various forms of B-cell lymphomas, THRLBCL is a rarely occurring subtype of the diffuse large B-cell lymphomas (DLBCL). DLBCL are a large group of lymphomas that account for ~25% of all non-Hodgkin lymphomas worldwide. THRLBCL is distinguished from the other DLBCL subtypes by the predominance of non-malignant T-cell lymphocytes and histiocytes over malignant B-cells in its tumors and tissue infiltrates.

THRLBCL commonly afflicts middle-aged individuals but has been diagnosed in rare pediatric cases. The disease usually presents with lymphadenopathy, i.e. bulky enlargements of lymph nodes in the neck, arm pit, or groin. However, most cases are at an advanced stage at diagnoses: further examinations frequently reveal that the disease has spread to multiple internal organs and tissues. The course of the disease is usually characterized as being poorly responsive to treatment: the disease's survival rates in past studies have been only ~46%. However, recent studies suggest that novel treatments can improve these survival rates.

Many studies have found that THRLBCL can overlap with the variant form of nodular lymphocyte predominant Hodgkin lymphoma (NLPHL). That is, some cases of variant NLPHL, which is a relatively indolent malignancy, share with THRLBCL similar disease presentations, histologies (i.e. microscopic appearances), genetic abnormalities, and apparent etiologies. Indeed, NLPHL can, in rare cases, progress into THRLBCL. Comapared to THRLBCL, however, these variant NLPHL cases are less aggressive, are more responsive to treatment, and have a better prognosis. Thus, THRLBCL and NLPHL may be biologically related diseases that represent opposite ends of a severity spectrum.

== Presentation ==
T-cell/histiocyte-rich large B-cell lymphoma most commonly afflicts middle-aged (i.e. 49–57 years old) individuals but has been diagnosed in persons aged 4 to 92 years. The disease has a male predominance ranging between 1.7:1 to 3:1 in different studies. In a review of 36 reported pediatric cases, the male to female ratio was 4:1. Patients typically present with enlarged lymph nodes in the neck, arm pit, and groin areas but on further examination are found to have involvement of their spleen (31% of cases), liver (52% of cases), bone marrow (27% of cases) and lung/or (13%) as determined by finding enlarged spleens and/or livers on physical examination or medical imaging; abnormal results on liver function tests, and/or THRLBCL infiltrates in bone marrow biopsies. Rare cases of the disease have presented with involvement of the skin (termed primary cutaneous THRLBCL), thyroid gland, thymus, gastrointestinal tract, pancreas, jaw bone, nasopharynx, brain, tongue, uterus, stomach, and soft tissues. Many patients will also complain of having systemic B symptoms such as fever, night sweats, weight loss, and malaise.

== Pathogenesis ==
Due to its rarity, the causes of THRLBCL have not been well studied and consequently remained unclear. The malignant B-cells in the disease commonly have mutations in several genes such as:

- JUNB which codes for JunB, a protein that regulates cell growth and survival and is highly expressed in other lymphocyte malignancies;
- DUSP2 (a gene suspected of being a tumor suppressor) which codes for dual specificity protein phosphatase 2, a protein that regulates several components of the ERK/MAPK signaling pathway that controls cell proliferation;
- SGK1 which codes for serine/threonine-protein kinase, a protein that regulates several signaling pathways that control cell proliferation and survival;
- SOCS1, a known oncogene and tumor suppressor which codes for suppressor of cytokine signaling 1; and
- CREBBP, a gene that is commonly mutated in other DLBCL subtypes as well as other lymphomas and codes for the transcription coregulator, CREB-binding protein.

The neoplastic cells in this disease also show gains on the short arm of chromosome 2 at position 16.1 which affect the REL protooncogene which codes for c-Rel, a protein that controls the maturation of B-cells and is implicated in the development of many cancers including lymphomas; as well as losses o the short armes of chromosomes 1 and 9 and 19.2 and 11.2 sites, respectively. These studies allow the possibility that THRLBC, similar to the other subtypes of DLBDL as well as a wide array of other cancers results at least in part from the step-wise development of gene changes such as mutations, altered expressions, amplifications (i.e. increases in the number of copies of specific genes), and chromosomal translocations that alter the expression of key genes in B-cells to result in the increasingly malignant behavior of these cells. However, the underlying causes for these gene changes as well as the identity of the genes whose changes contribute to the malignant behavior of the neoplastic B-cells in THRLBC have yet to be defined.

The neoplastic B-cells in THRLBCL infiltrations are dominated by high numbers of histiocytes and dendritic cells. Studies suggest that the latter cells help to create a microenvironment that is tolerant or promotes tumor growth and spread to other sites.

== Diagnosis ==
The diagnosis of THRLBCL, particularly as it pertains to differentiating it from DLBCL and other lymphomas, depends on examining involved tissues obtained by biopsy or operation for their histology, i.e. microscopic anatomy. The tissues involved in THRLBCL commonly show an effacement of their normal architecture by a diffusely growing infiltrate of non-malignant T-cell lymphocytes, histiocytes, and neoplastic (i.e. malignant) B-cells. The malignant B-cells represent <10% of the cells in these lesions and bear resemblances to centroblast, immunoblasts, and/or the Reed–Sternberg cells found in Hodgkin disease, including in particular Hodgkin disease's nodular variant. The non-malignant T-cells generally have a reactive morphology as indicated by their larger than normal size and irregularly shaped cell nuclei. And, the histiocytes, which are not always present in these lesions, have a non-epithelial cell appearance. These infiltrates often resemble these seen in inflammation. The malignant B-cells in THRLBCL are definitively identified by immunophenotyping to detect B-cell marker proteins (e.g. CD19, CD20, CD22, CD79a, and/or PAX5). These cells may also express other identifying marker proteins such as Bcl-6 (50–90% of cases), the product of the MYC gene, c-Myc (most cases), Bcl-2 (40% of cases), MUC1 (30% of cases), and, in a minority of cases, CD10. The T cells in these lesions are predominantly cytotoxic T cells as indicated by their expression of T-cell receptor, CD8 T-cell co-receptor, and CD5 cell surface proteins. And, the histiocytes in these lesions express CD68 and CD163 cell surface proteins. Before making a diagnosis of THRLBCL in a pediatric population, congenital and acquired immunodeficiency diseases, which can cause aberrant immune responses with a histology similar to THRLBCL, must be ruled-out.

=== Differential diagnosis ===
While the histological features of THRLBCL are distinctly different that those found in other DLBCL subtypes, they can closely resemble, and be mistaken for, those found in the variant form of nodular lymphocyte predominant Hodgkin lymphoma. Some important histological features that favor the diagnosis of THRLBCL over NLPHL include the presence of:

1. <10% neoplastic B-cells;
2. CD163-expressing histiocytes (cases of THRLBCL in which histiocytes are absent appear to take a less aggressive course than cases in which these cells are present);
3. a diffuse rather than nodular cell infiltration pattern with any nodular infiltrates present in THRLBCL containing follicular dendritic cells;
4. PD-1-, CD4-, and CD57-expressing T-cells;
5. cells strongly expressing the BAT3/BAG6 ubiquitin domain-containing protein; and
6. few or no small lymphocytes, variant Hodgkin i.e. popcorn and Reed-Sternberg cells.

== Treatment ==
Patients diagnosed with THRLBCL have been treated with chemotherapy regimens similar to the regimens used to treat DLBCL. These earlier used chemotherapy regimens (e.g. the CHOP regimen consisting of three chemotherapy drugs (cyclophosphamide, hydroxydoxorubicin, and oncovin) plus a glucocorticoid, either prednisone or prednisolone) achieve complete response rates of 48% to 85%, 3-year overall survival rates of 50% to 64%, and 5-year overall survival rates of 46% to 58%. The addition of immunotherapy drug, rituximab, to the CHOP regimen appears to have improved these results: in one study, patients receiving the R-CHOP regimen had a three-year overall survival rate of 75%. Since treatment of the variant form of nodular lymphocyte predominant Hodgkin lymphoma using different and less aggressive drug regimens achieves better results than the regimens used to treat THRLBCL, it is clinically important to distinguish the two diseases.
