= Large B-cell lymphoma arising in HHV8-associated multicentric Castleman's disease =

Large B-cell lymphoma arising in HHV8-associated multicentric Castleman's disease is a type of large B-cell lymphoma, recognized in the WHO 2008 classification. It is sometimes called the plasmablastic form of multicentric Castleman disease. It has sometimes been confused with plasmablastic lymphoma in the literature, although that is a dissimilar specific entity. It has variable CD20 expression and unmutated immunoglobulin variable region genes.

== Biology ==
Castleman disease (CD) is a lymphoproliferative disorder of unknown cause. CD is associated with an increased risk of B-cell lymphoma.

Human herpesvirus 8 (HHV-8), also known as Kaposi sarcoma-associated herpesvirus (KSHV) has been found in some cases of multicentric Castleman disease (MCD). The HHV8 can give rise to an increased number of plasmablast cells within the mantle zone of B-cell follicles. These plasmablasts express IgM-immunoglobulin light chains, most often of lambda subtype. These plasmablasts can give rise to a spectrum of abnormalities including progression to microlymphoma (microscopic clusters of plasmablast cells) or clinical lymphoma.

This type of lymphoma is predominantly seen in acquired immunodeficiencies, including acquired immunodeficiency syndrome (AIDS) but it can also occur in immunosuppression such as with organ transplantation or the elderly. The plasmablasts do not show rearranged immunoglobulin genes, and typically lack EBV infection.

The disease predominantly affects lymph nodes and the spleen, a pattern dissimilar to plasmablastic lymphoma of the oral cavity of AIDS which is not associated with HHV-8 infection. Despite traditional chemotherapy with CHOP (cyclophosphamide, doxorubicin, prednisone, vincristine), and the possible addition of antiviral therapy and inhibition of specific cellular targets including the use of rituximab, the prognosis in this lymphoma has been poor.

This lymphoma subtype has sometimes been confused with plasmablastic lymphoma in the literature, although that is a dissimilar specific entity. Similarly, this subtype is considered distinct from other lymphomas which have a plasmablastic immunophenotype such as primary effusion lymphoma, ALK+ large B-cell lymphoma, and extracavitary HHV–8-positive lymphoma.

HHV8 is also associated with Kaposi's sarcoma and with another subtype of lymphoma, primary effusion lymphoma, previously called body cavity-based lymphoma.

== See also ==
- Lymphoma
