= Primary mediastinal B-cell lymphoma =

Primary mediastinal large B-cell lymphoma
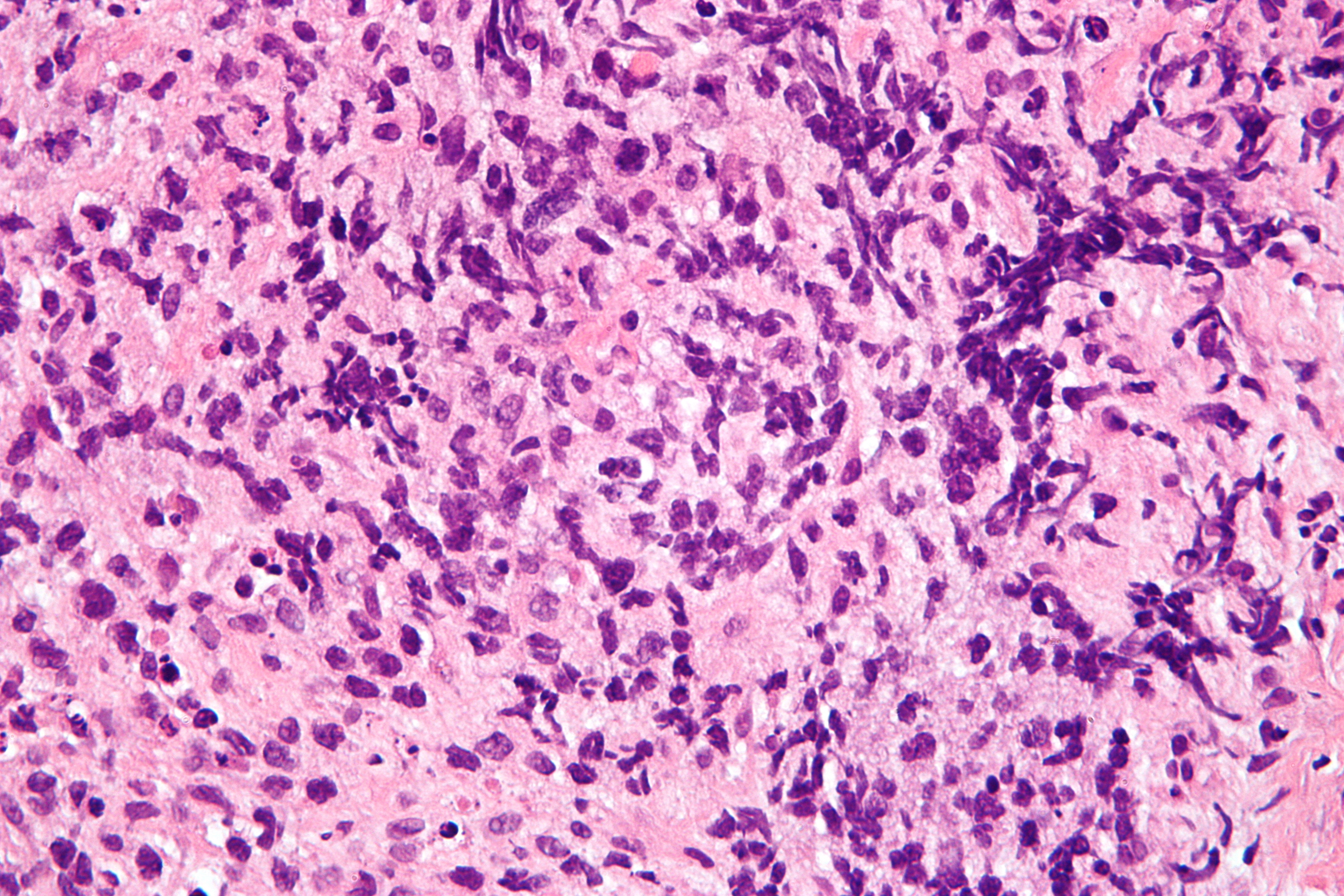
- Micrograph of a primary mediastinal large B-cell lymphoma. H&E stain.
- Specialty: Hematology and oncology

Primary mediastinal B-cell lymphoma, abbreviated PMBL or PMBCL, is a rare type of lymphoma that forms in the mediastinum (the space in between the lungs) and predominantly affects young adults.

While it had previously been considered a subtype of diffuse large B-cell lymphoma when first described in the early 1980s, the World Health Organization no longer classifies it as such, based on distinct clinicopathologic and molecular features.

== Pathophysiology ==
PMBCL arises from a putative thymic peripheral B cell. It has several distinctive biological features. Molecular analysis shows that PMBCL is distinct from other types of diffuse large B-cell lymphomas (DLBCL). MAL gene expression is seen in 70%, unlike other diffuse large B-cell lymphomas. Gene expression profiling shows considerable variance from other DLBCLs and similarity to Hodgkin disease.

PMBCL is CD20 positive, expresses pan-B markers including CD79a, and has clonal immunoglobulin gene rearrangements and mRNA but paradoxically does not express cytoplasmic or cell surface immunoglobulin.Clinically, PMBCL is unusual in several respects. Despite 80% PMBCL being stage I or II, the presenting anterior mediastinal mass is often over 10 cm and is locally invasive of lung, chest wall, pleura, and pericardium. At initial presentation, PMBCL is usually confined to mediastinum, but its bulk, rather than additional adenopathy, can sometimes be palpated at the low neck. Increased LDH is seen in approximately 75%, but unlike other large cell lymphomas, no increase in beta-2 microglobulin is seen even when bulky which may relate to defective major histocompatibility complex expression.

== Diagnosis ==
Diagnosis requires a biopsy, so that the exact type of tissue can be determined by examination under a microscope. PMBCL is a distinct type of lymphoma that shares some features with both diffuse large B-cell lymphoma, and nodular sclerosing Hodgkin lymphoma (NSHL). Tumors that are even more closely related to NSHL than typical for PMBCL are called gray zone lymphoma.

== Treatment ==
Multiagent chemotherapy is recommended, but the preferred regimen is controversial, as is consolidative radiotherapy.

Treatment commonly begins with either R-CHOP (rituximab, cyclophosphamide, doxorubicin, vincristine, prednisolone) or DA-EPOCH-R (dose-adjusted etoposide, prednisolone, vincristine, cyclophosphamide, doxorubicin, rituximab). Other, more intense, regimens may be more effective. PD-1 and PD-L1 inhibitors can be used.

Radiation therapy may be added, especially if chemotherapy does not seem sufficient on its own. Radiation may cause other health problems later, such as breast cancer, and there is some debate about the best approach to it.FDG-PET scanning is not as useful for predicting treatment success in PMBCL as it is in other lymphomas.

== Prognosis ==
Most people with PMBCL are successfully treated and survive for many years. However, if the initial treatment is unsuccessful, or if it returns, the long-term prognosis is worse. Relapses generally appear within 12 to 18 months after the completion of treatment.

== Epidemiology ==
This lymphoma is most commonly seen in women between the age of 20 and 40.

== See also ==
- Diffuse large B-cell lymphoma
- Hodgkin lymphoma
