= Gray zone lymphoma =

Gray zone lymphoma, often presenting as large tumors in the mediastinum, is a type of lymphoma that is characterized by having cellular features of both classic Hodgkin's lymphomas (cHL) and large B-cell lymphomas.

== Sources ==
- Traverse-Glehen A, Mediastinal gray zone lymphoma: the missing link between classic Hodgkin's lymphoma and mediastinal large B-cell lymphoma. Am J Surg Pathol 2005 Nov; 29(11):1411–21
- Hodgkin's lymphoma and Grey-zone lymphomas
