= Effacement =

Effacement may refer to:

== Histology ==
- Effacement (histology), the shortening, or thinning, of a tissue.
- Cervical effacement, the thinning of the cervix.

== Paleontology ==
- Effacement, an evolutionary trend resulting in the loss of surface detail in trilobites.
