= Progressive transformation of germinal centres =

- Other names: progressive transformation of germinal centers
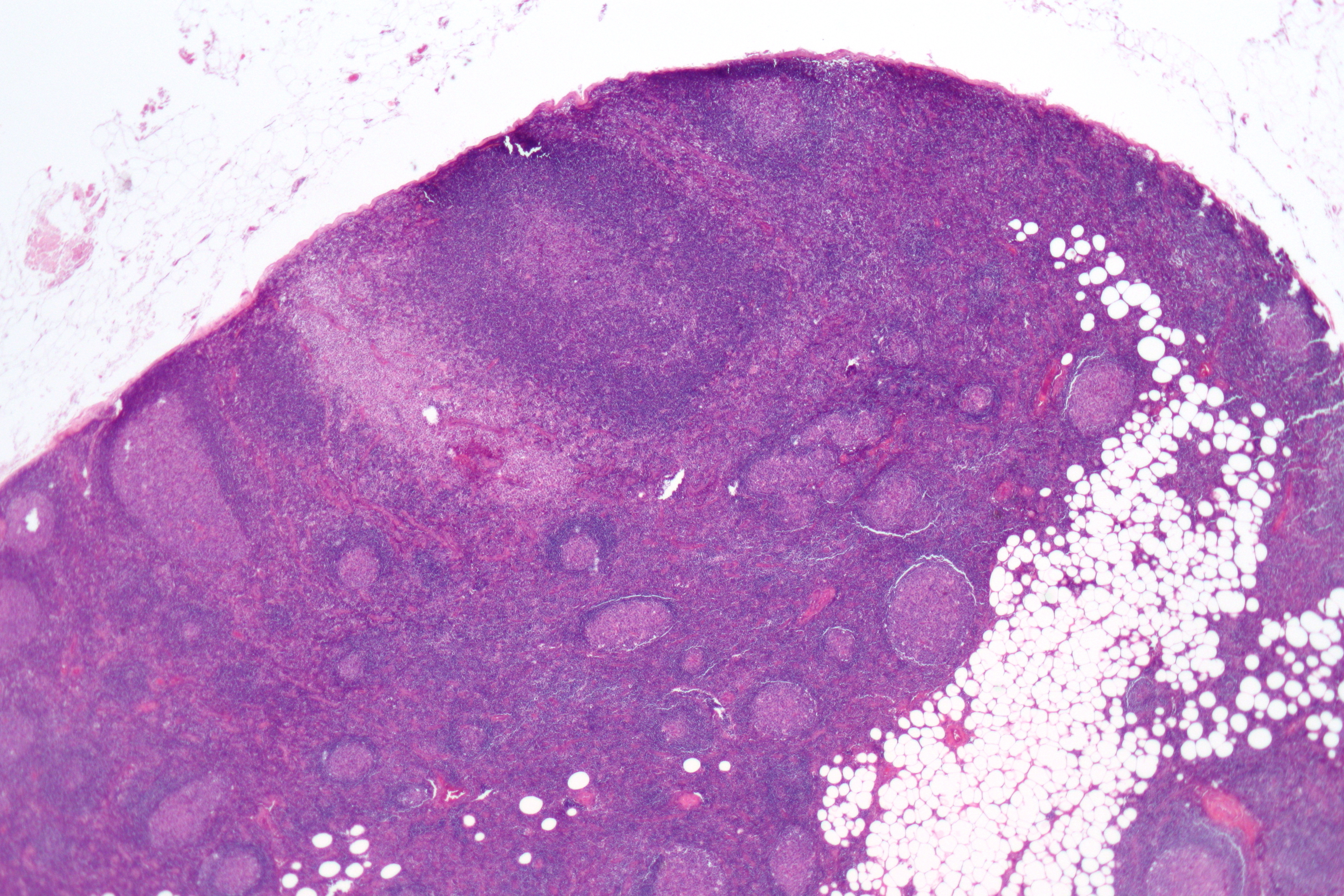
- Micrograph of a lymph node biopsy showing progressive transformation of germinal centres. H&E stain.
- Specialty: Infectious disease

Progressive transformation of germinal centres (PTGCs) is a reactive lymph node process of undetermined cause.

== Signs and symptoms ==
PTGC is usually characterized by localized lymphadenopathy and is otherwise typically asymptomatic.

== Diagnosis ==
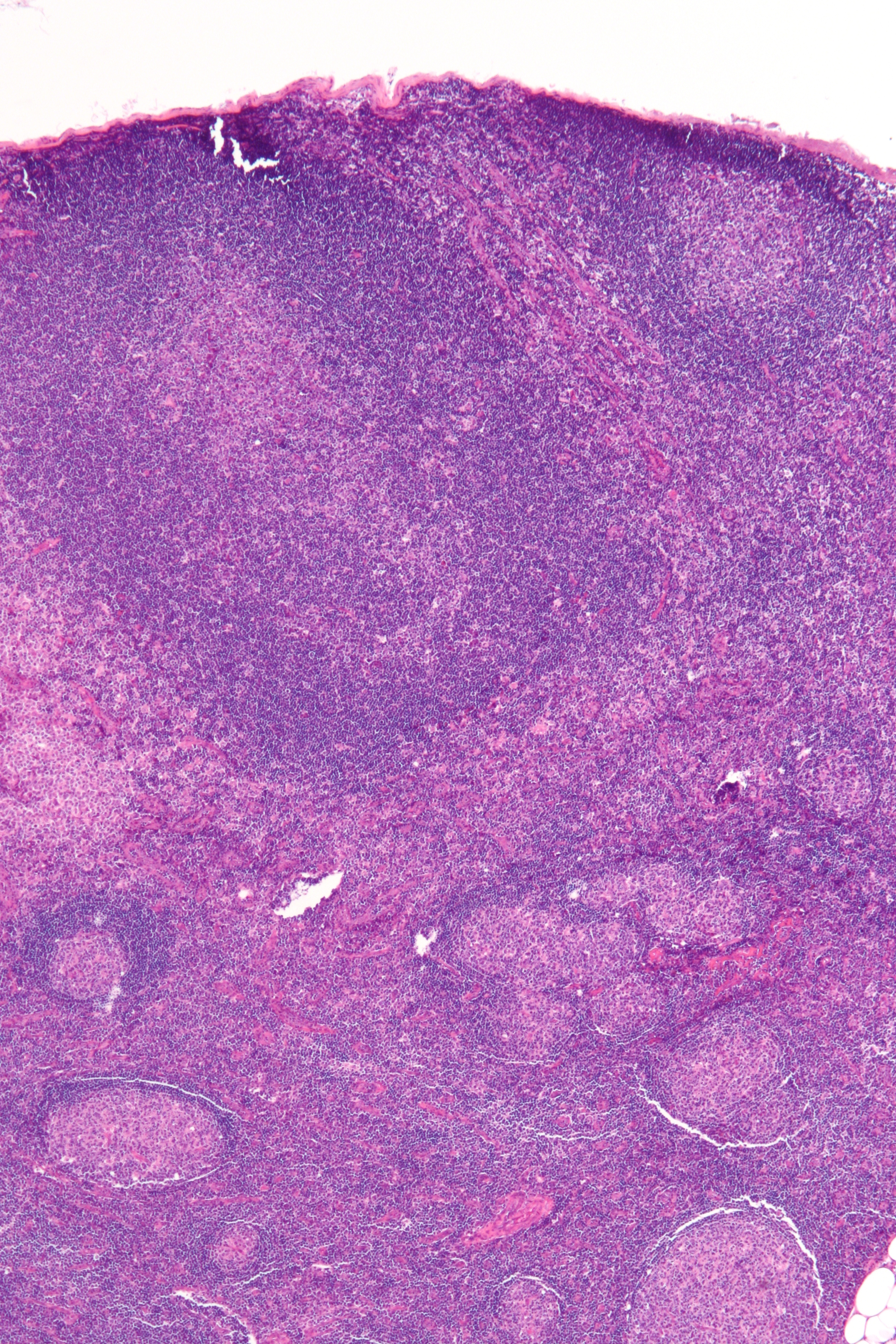
Micrograph showing PTGCs. H&E stain.

PTGC is diagnosed by surgical excision of the affected lymph node(s), and examination by a pathologist. The differential diagnosis includes non-neoplastic causes of lymphadenopathy (e.g. cat-scratch fever, Kikuchi disease) and malignancy, i.e. cancer.

=== Microscopic appearance ===
PTGCs is characterized by:

- follicular hyperplasia (many follicles),
- focally large germinal centres, with poorly demarcated germinal centre (GC)/mantle zone interfaces (as GCs infiltrated by mantle zone lymphocytes), and
- an expanded mantle zone.

== Treatment ==
PTGC is treated by excisional biopsy and follow-up. It may occasionally recur and a small proportion of patients have been reported to subsequently develop nodular lymphocyte predominant Hodgkin lymphoma.

== See also ==
- Lymphadenopathy
- Nodular lymphocyte predominant Hodgkin lymphoma
