= Carl Sternberg =

Austrian professor and pathologist

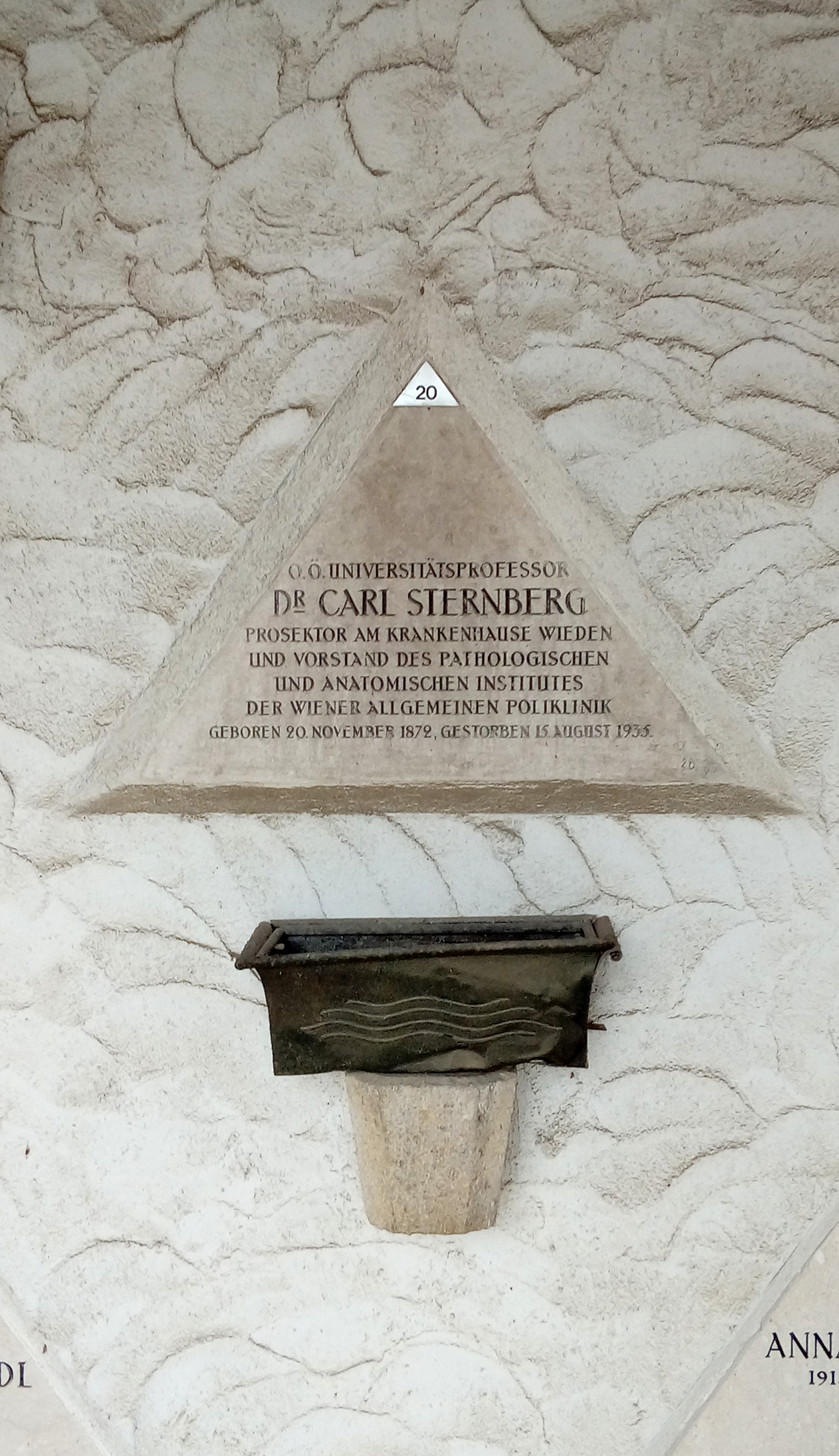
Feuerhalle Simmering, grave of Carl Sternberg

Carl Sternberg (November 20, 1872 – August 15, 1935) was an Austrian pathologist. The Reed–Sternberg cell is named after him and American physician Dorothy Reed Mendenhall.

== Biography ==
=== Education ===
Sternberg studied medicine at the Medical faculty of the University of Vienna where he received his doctorate in 1896. He then completed training in general internal medicine at Vienna General Hospital and worked as an assistant to Richard Paltauf. He was habilitated for pathological anatomy in 1903.

=== Work in the field ===
In 1908, Sternberg moved to Brünn where he taught as a professor until 1926. During World War I, he served as a military physician for the Austrian army where he earned a reputation for advocating for the well-being of the soldiers. Sternberg returned to teaching after the war. Sternberg's research focused mostly on tuberculosis and leukemia. It was through his studies of tuberculosis that he discovered a novel cell that is today called the Reed–Sternberg cell.

=== Death ===
Sternberg died suddenly of a myocardial infarction in 1935. He was cremated at Feuerhalle Simmering, where also his ashes are buried.

=== Publications ===
Uber eine eigenartige unter dem Bilde der Pseudoleukamie verlaufende Tuberculose des lymphatischen Apparates. Ztschr Heilk 1898;19:21–90.
