= Lymphomatoid granulomatosis =

- Specialty: Hematology and oncology

Lymphomatoid granulomatosis (LYG or LG) is a very rare lymphoproliferative disorder first characterized in 1972. Lymphomatoid means lymphoma-like and granulomatosis denotes the microscopic characteristic of the presence of granulomas with polymorphic lymphoid infiltrates and focal necrosis within it.

LG most commonly affects middle aged people, but has occasionally been observed in young people. Males are found to be affected twice as often as females.

== Causes ==
Lymphomatoid granulomatosis involves malignant B cells and reactive, non-malignant T cells and is almost always associated with infection of the malignant B cells by the Epstein-Barr virus; it is therefore considered to be a form of the Epstein-Barr virus-associated lymphoproliferative diseases. The disease is believed to be induced by a combination of Epstein Barr virus infection and immunosuppression through immunosuppressive drugs (with case reports of methotrexate and azathioprine), infections such as HIV or chronic viral hepatitis or endogenous T cell defects.

== Pathophysiology ==
The onset of the disease results in proliferation of EBV-infected malignant B-cells and a cytotoxic T-cell response which in turn leads to organ infiltration and dysfunction of the affected organs. The disease typically always relapse after successful treatment due to inability of the immune system and current viral drugs to eliminate an EBV-infection. If the onset of the disease can be linked to use of immunosuppressive drugs then discontinuation of these drugs may hinder a relapse. Organs usually affected are the skin, lungs, central nervous system while liver and kidney are affected to lesser extent. The pulmonary complications are usually what leads to death, however, CNS involvement that affects up to one third of the patients can be very severe with mental status changes, ataxia, hemiparesis, seizures, unconsciousness and death, typically followed in that order.

The disease has been seen to transform to diffuse large B-cell lymphoma and while LG is graded I-III based on the number of large EBV-positive B-cells, grade II and III can be considered as a variant of T-cell rich diffuse large B-cell lymphoma.

== Treatment ==
Treatment depends on the grade (I-III) but typically consist of cortisone, rituximab and chemotherapy (etoposide, vincristine, cyclophosphamide, doxorubicin). Methotrexate has been seen to induce LG. Interferon alpha has been used by the US National Cancer Institute with varying results. In recent years hematopoietic stem cell transplantation has been performed on LG-patients with relative good success; a 2013 study identifying 10 cases found that 8 patients survived the treatment and were disease free several years later. Two of the disease free patients later died, one from suicide and one from graft versus host disease after a second transplantation 4 years later. The remaining two patients died from sepsis after the transplantation.

== Prognosis ==
The current mortality is over 60% after 5 years. However, due to hematopoietic stem cell transplantation being performed only in recent years, this number could potentially be lowered in the future. In people with CNS involvement, treatment with Interferon alpha at the US National Cancer Institute resulted in complete remission in 90% of patients.

== See also ==
- List of cutaneous conditions
