= Reed–Sternberg cell =

Cell type associated with Hodgkin lymphoma

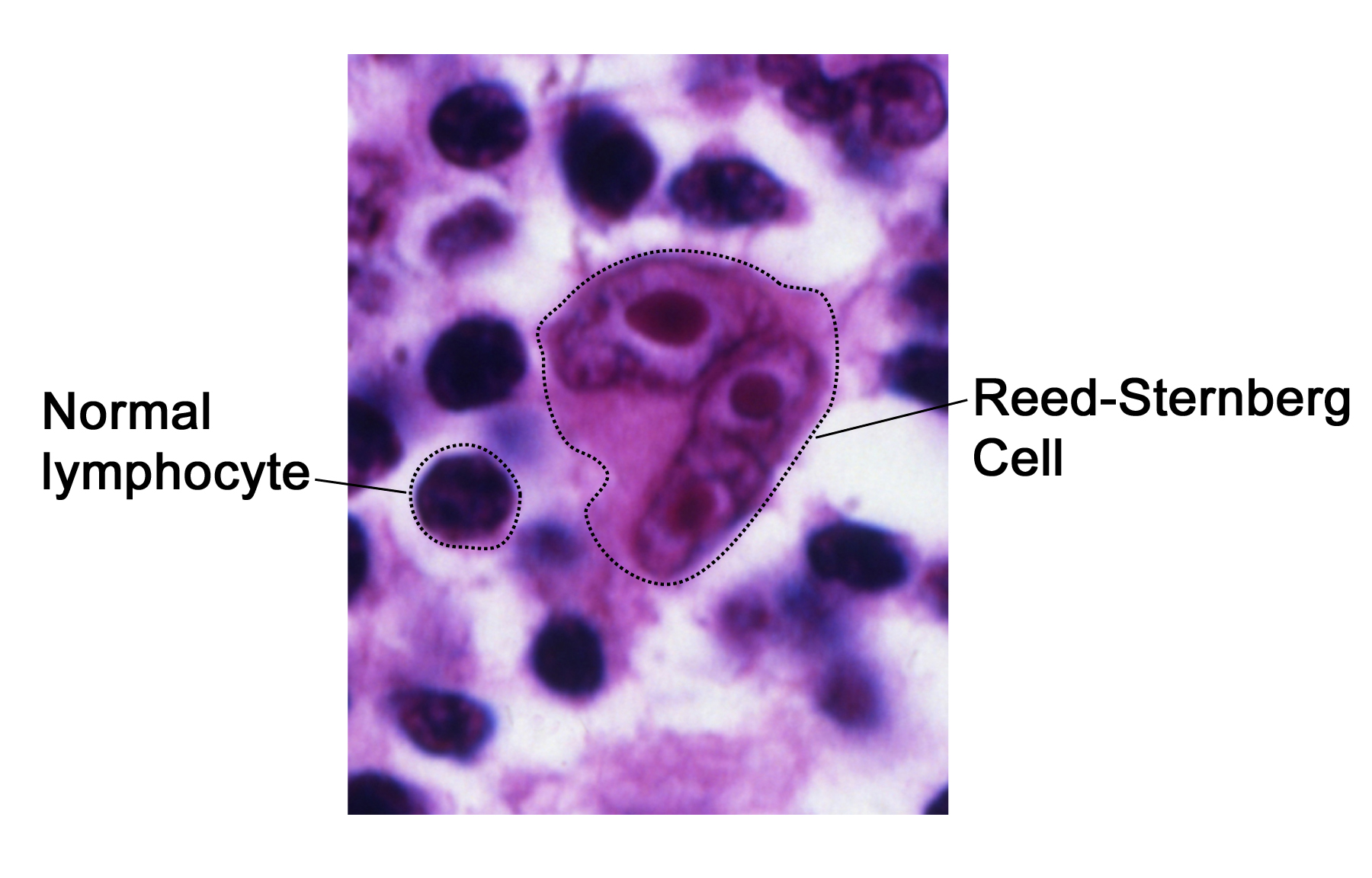
Micrograph showing a classic Reed–Sternberg cell

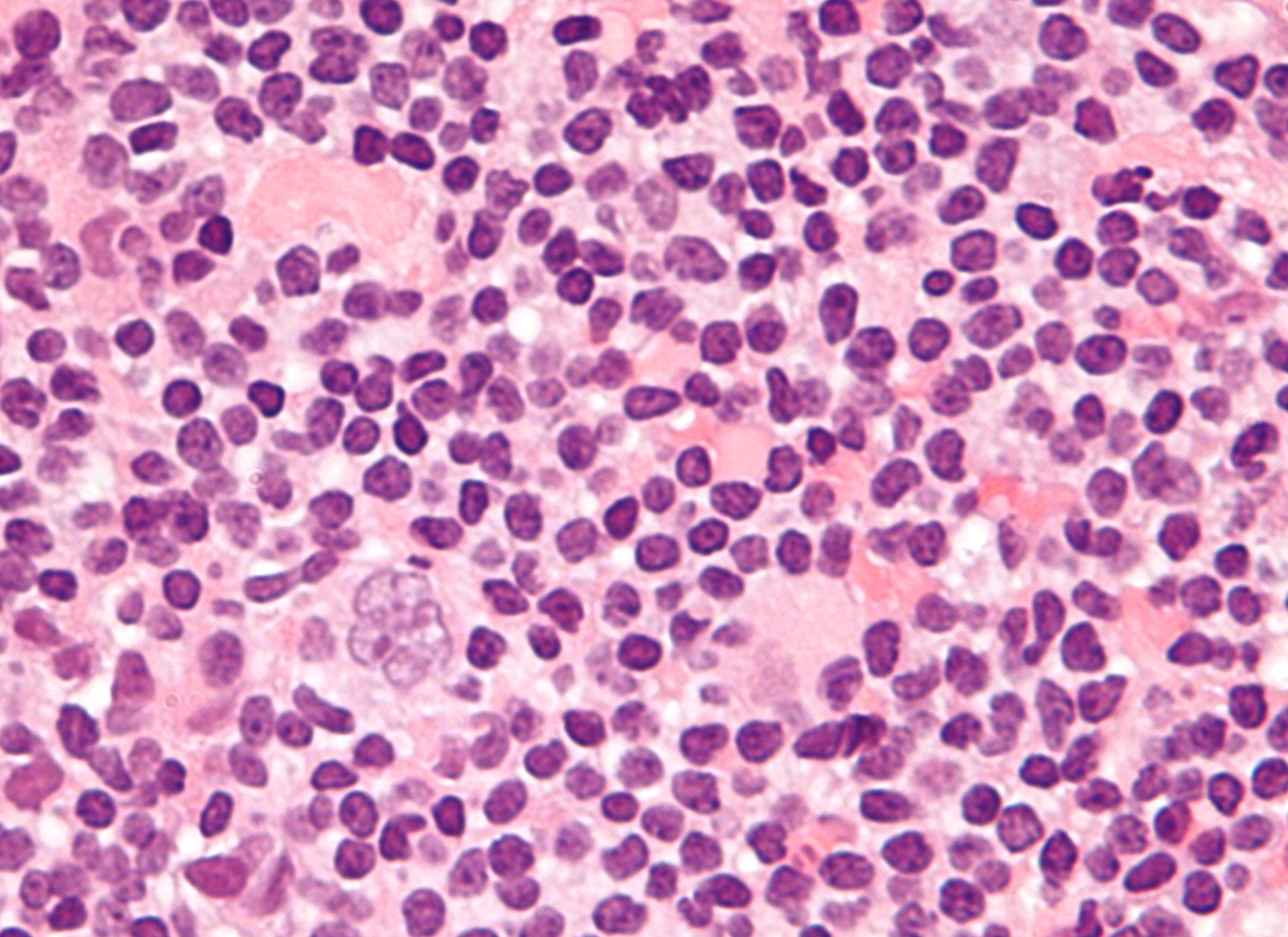
Micrograph showing a "popcorn cell", the Reed–Sternberg cell variant seen in nodular lymphocyte predominant Hodgkin lymphoma. H&E stain

Reed–Sternberg cells (also known as lacunar histiocytes for certain types) are distinctive, giant cells found with light microscopy in biopsies from individuals with Hodgkin lymphoma. They are usually derived from B lymphocytes, classically considered crippled germinal center B cells. In the vast majority of cases, the immunoglobulin genes of Reed–Sternberg cells have undergone both V(D)J recombination and somatic hypermutation, establishing an origin from a germinal center or postgerminal center B cell. Despite having the genetic signature of a B cell, the Reed–Sternberg cells of classical Hodgkin lymphoma fail to express most B-cell–specific genes, including the immunoglobulin genes. The cause of this wholesale reprogramming of gene expression has yet to be fully explained. It presumably is the result of widespread epigenetic changes of uncertain etiology, but is partly a consequence of so-called "crippling" mutations acquired during somatic hypermutation. Seen against a sea of B cells, they give the tissue a moth-eaten appearance.

Reed–Sternberg cells are large (30–50 microns) and are either multinucleated or have a bilobed nucleus with prominent eosinophilic inclusion-like nucleoli (thus resembling an "owl's eye" appearance). Reed–Sternberg cells are CD30 and CD15 positive except in the lymphocyte predominance type where they are negative, but are usually positive for CD20 and CD45. The presence of these cells is necessary in the diagnosis of Hodgkin lymphoma – the absence of Reed–Sternberg cells has very high negative predictive value. The presence of these cells is confirmed mainly by use of biomarkers in immunohistochemistry. They can also be found in reactive lymphadenopathy (such as infectious mononucleosis immunoblasts which are RS like in appearance, and in carbamazepine associated lymphadenopathy) and very rarely in other types of non-Hodgkin lymphomas. Anaplastic large cell lymphoma may show RS-like cells as well.

== History ==
They are named after Dorothy Reed Mendenhall and Carl Sternberg, who provided the first definitive microscopic descriptions of Hodgkin's disease.

== Pathology ==
=== Hodgkin lymphoma ===
A special type of Reed–Sternberg cell (RSC) is the lacunar histiocyte, whose cytoplasm retracts when fixed in formalin, so the nuclei give the appearance of cells that lie with empty spaces (called lacunae) between them. These are characteristic of the nodular sclerosis subtype of Hodgkin lymphoma.

Mummified RSCs (compact nucleus, basophilic cytoplasm, no nucleolus) are also associated with classical Hodgkin lymphoma while popcorn cells (small cell with hyper-lobulated nucleus and small nucleoli) are lymph histiocytic (L-H) variant of Reed–Sternberg cells and are associated with nodular lymphocyte predominant Hodgkin lymphoma (NLPHL).

RSCs and one RSC cell line (L1236 cells) but not other RSC cell lines express very high levels of ALOX15 (i.e., 15-lipoxygenase-1) or possibly ALOX15B (i.e. 15-lipoxygenase-2), enzymes that metabolize arachidonic acid and various other polyunsaturated fatty acids to a wide array of bioactive products including in particular those of the 15-Hydroperoxyeicosatetraenoic acid family of arachidonic acid metabolites. This is unusual in that lymphocytes typically express little or no ALOX15. It is suggested that ALOX15 and/or ALOX15B, perhaps operating through one of its arachidonic acid-derived products, the eoxins, contributes to the development and/or morphology of Hodgkin lymphoma.

== See also ==
- Non-Hodgkin lymphoma
- Hodgkin lymphoma
