= Nodular sclerosing Hodgkin lymphoma =

- Other names: Nodular sclerosis
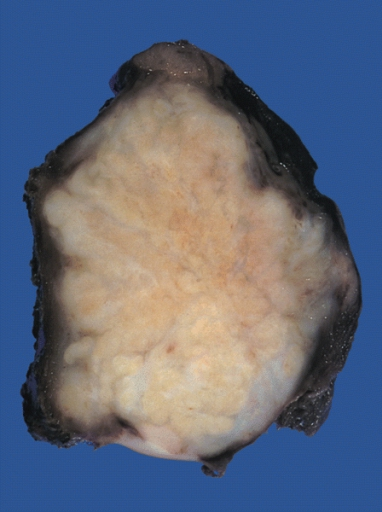
- The distinct nodules on the cut surface of this lymph node strongly suggest the diagnosis of nodular sclerosis.
- Specialty: Oncology

Nodular sclerosing Hodgkin lymphoma ("NSHL") or Nodular sclerosis is a form of Hodgkin lymphoma that is the most common subtype of HL in developed countries. It affects females slightly more than males and has a median age of onset at ~28 years. It is composed of large tumor nodules with lacunar Reed–Sternberg cell (RS cells) surrounded by fibrotic collagen bands.

The British National Lymphoma Investigation further categorized NSHL based upon Reed–Sternberg cells into "nodular sclerosis type I" (NS I) and "nodular sclerosis type II" (NS II), with the first subtype responding better to treatment.
