= Nodal marginal zone B cell lymphoma =

- Specialty: Hematology, oncology

Nodal marginal zone B cell lymphoma (NMZL) is an uncommon form of marginal-zone lymphoma that can produce colonization of the follicles in the lymph node. It is a form of low grade lymphoma with similar incidence in men and women and a mean age of 61 years (range 26–92 years). It is often associated with Sjogren syndrome. It shows interfollicular infiltrate of monocytoid, centrocyte-like B cells that are 2–3× larger than small lymphocytes with partial/total effacement of lymph node architecture.
