= ALK+ large B-cell lymphoma =

Type of cancer

ALK+ large B-cell lymphoma is a type of lymphoma. It was first reported in 1997. It is a rare, aggressive large B-cell process that shows ALK expression. It is distinct from anaplastic large cell lymphoma, a T-cell lymphoma.

== Pathophysiology ==
Upregulation of ALK is mainly due to chromosomal translocation t(2;17), resulting in a fusion gene of CLTC with ALK, but can rarely be due to t(2;5), fusing NPM1 with ALK; the later is the usual finding in anaplastic large cell lymphoma (ALCL). The t(2;17) translocation occurs in less than 1% of cases of ALK+ ALCL, but has been identified in inflammatory myofibroblastic tumors.

There is no association with Epstein–Barr virus or HHV8, or immunosuppression. The cells are CD20 and CD30 negative, showing weak focal expression in 3% and 6% respectively. They are EMA and CD138 positive, showing 100% expression respectively.

== Diagnosis ==
The median age of diagnosis is approximately late thirties to early forties. The estimates of childhood disease vary (8%, 15%, 30%) but it can be seen at any age.

The disease usually arises in lymph nodes, particularly the neck, but extranodal involvement, including in the gastrointestinal tract, nasal cavity, ovary and brain, has been described. Morphologically, there are large immunoblast-like cells with large central nucleoli, often cellular clusters, with a predilection for the lymph node sinuses in a cohesive pattern that can suggest carcinoma cells.

== Treatment ==
Multiagent chemotherapy is given, and can result in long-term success, particularly in childhood but prognosis is generally poor, particularly in higher stage disease.

== See also ==
- Lymphoma
