= Effacement (histology) =

Effacement is the shortening, or thinning, of a tissue.

It can refer to cervical effacement. It can also refer to a process occurring in podocytes in nephrotic syndrome.

In histopathology, it refers to the near obliteration of a tissue, as in the normal parenchyma of tissues in the case of some cancers.
