= Nodular lymphocyte predominant Hodgkin lymphoma =

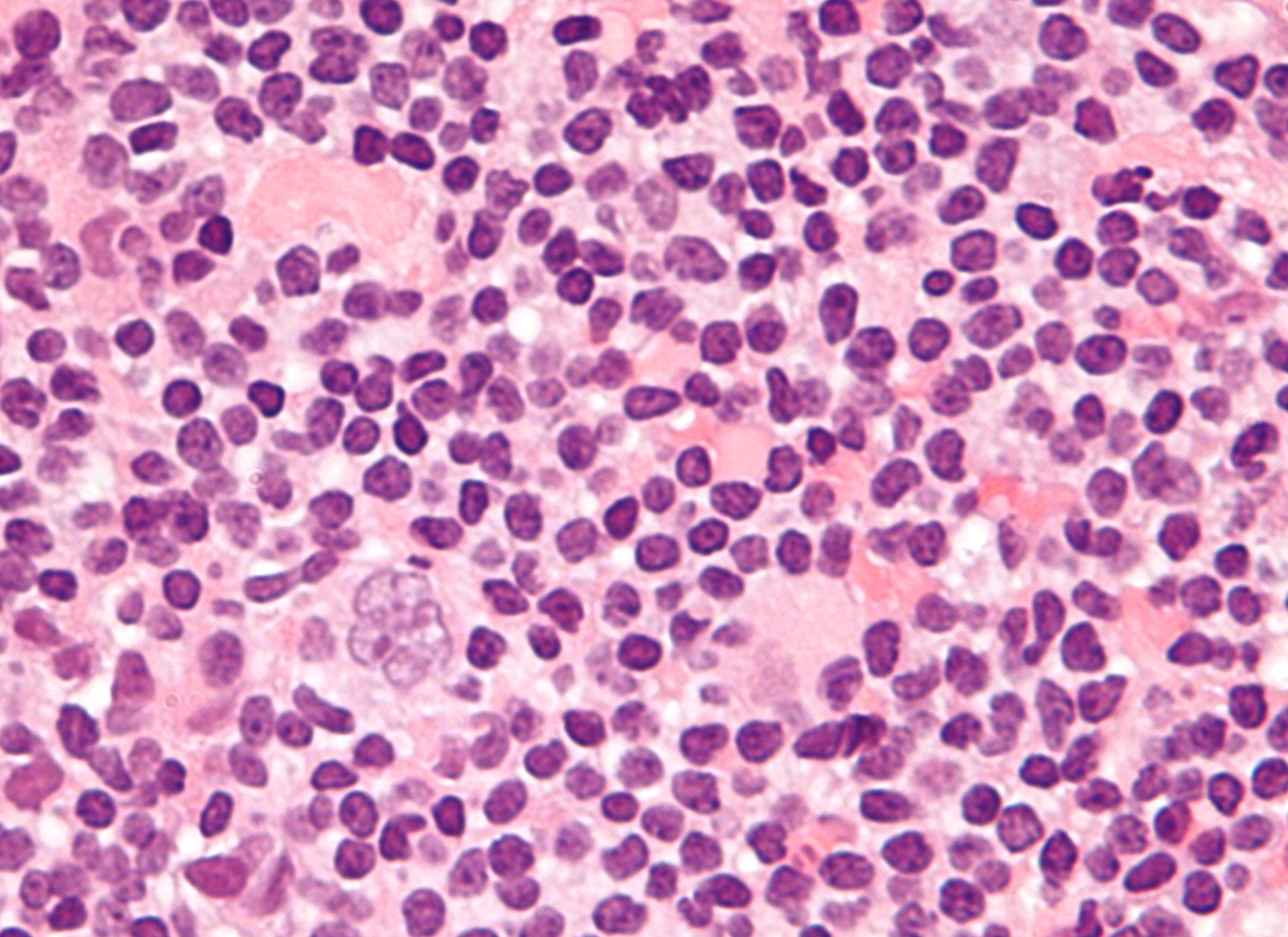
- Micrograph of a lymph node biopsy showing nodular lymphocyte predominant Hodgkin lymphoma, with the Reed–Sternberg cell variant that has a popcorn-shaped nucleus (left-bottom of image). H&E stain.
- Specialty: Hematology and oncology
- Frequency: 0.1–0.2 cases / 100000 per year

Nodular lymphocyte predominant Hodgkin lymphoma (NLPHL) is a slow-growing CD20 positive form of Hodgkin lymphoma, a cancer of the immune system's B cells.

NLPHL is an uncommon sub-type of Hodgkin lymphoma, making up 5–10% of Hodgkin lymphomas. It is distinguished from classic Hodgkin lymphoma by the presence of CD20 positive lymphocyte predominant cells, also known as popcorn cells due to their polylobated nuclei, which look like popcorn.

There are small but clear differences in prognosis between the various forms. Lymphocyte predominant HL is an uncommon subtype composed of vague nodules of numerous reactive lymphocytes admixed with large popcorn-shaped RSC. Unlike classic RSC, the non-classic popcorn-shaped RS cells of NLPHL are CD15 and CD30 negative while positive for the B cell marker CD20. The anti-CD20 monoclonal antibody Rituximab has been used in lymphocyte predominant Hodgkin lymphoma with encouraging results.

BCL6 gene rearrangements have been frequently observed.

== Signs and symptoms ==
B symptoms are uncommon.

== Diagnosis ==
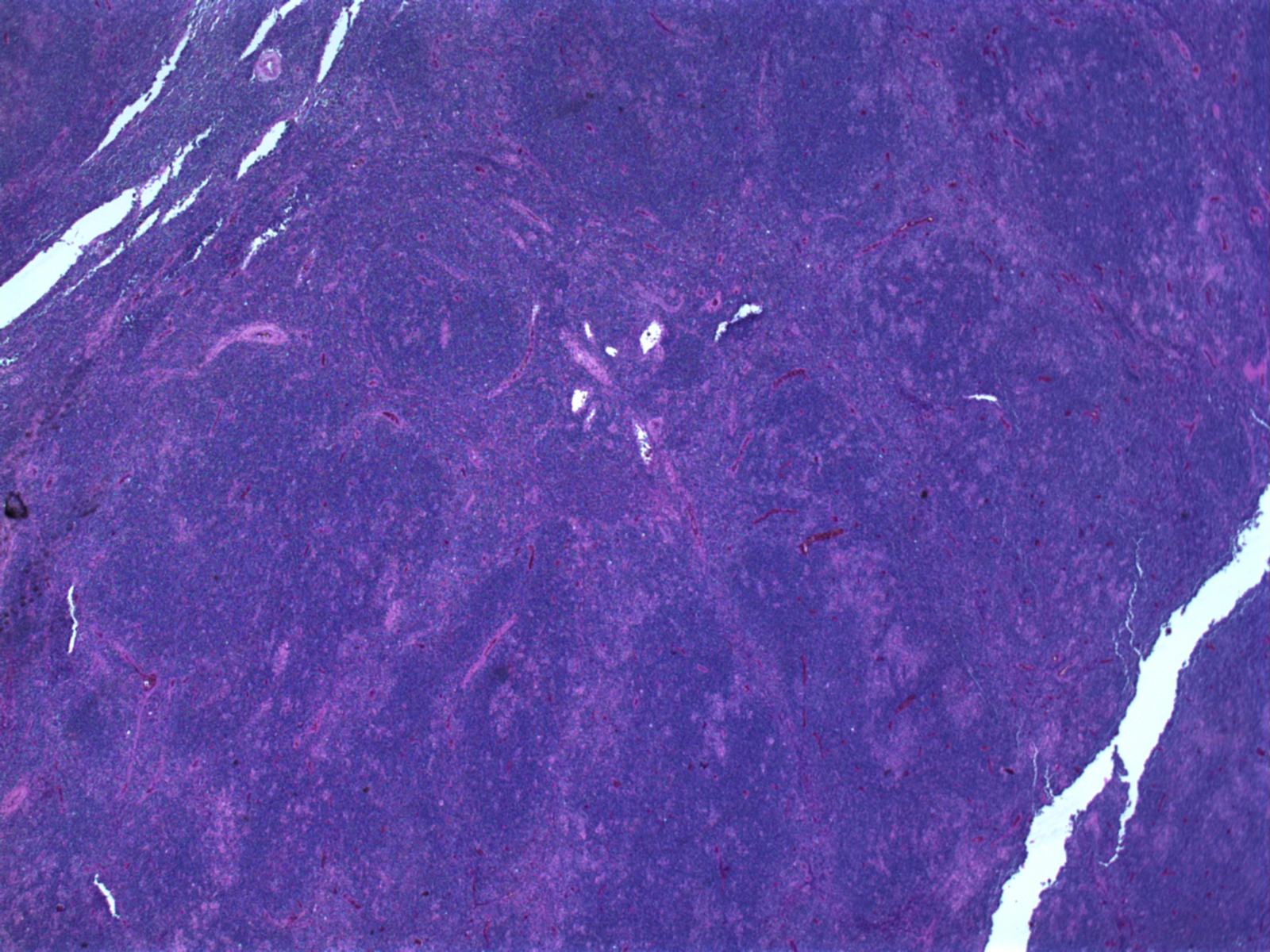
Hodgkin lymphoma, nodular lymphocyte predominant (low power view). Notice the nodular architecture and the areas of "mottling". (H&E)

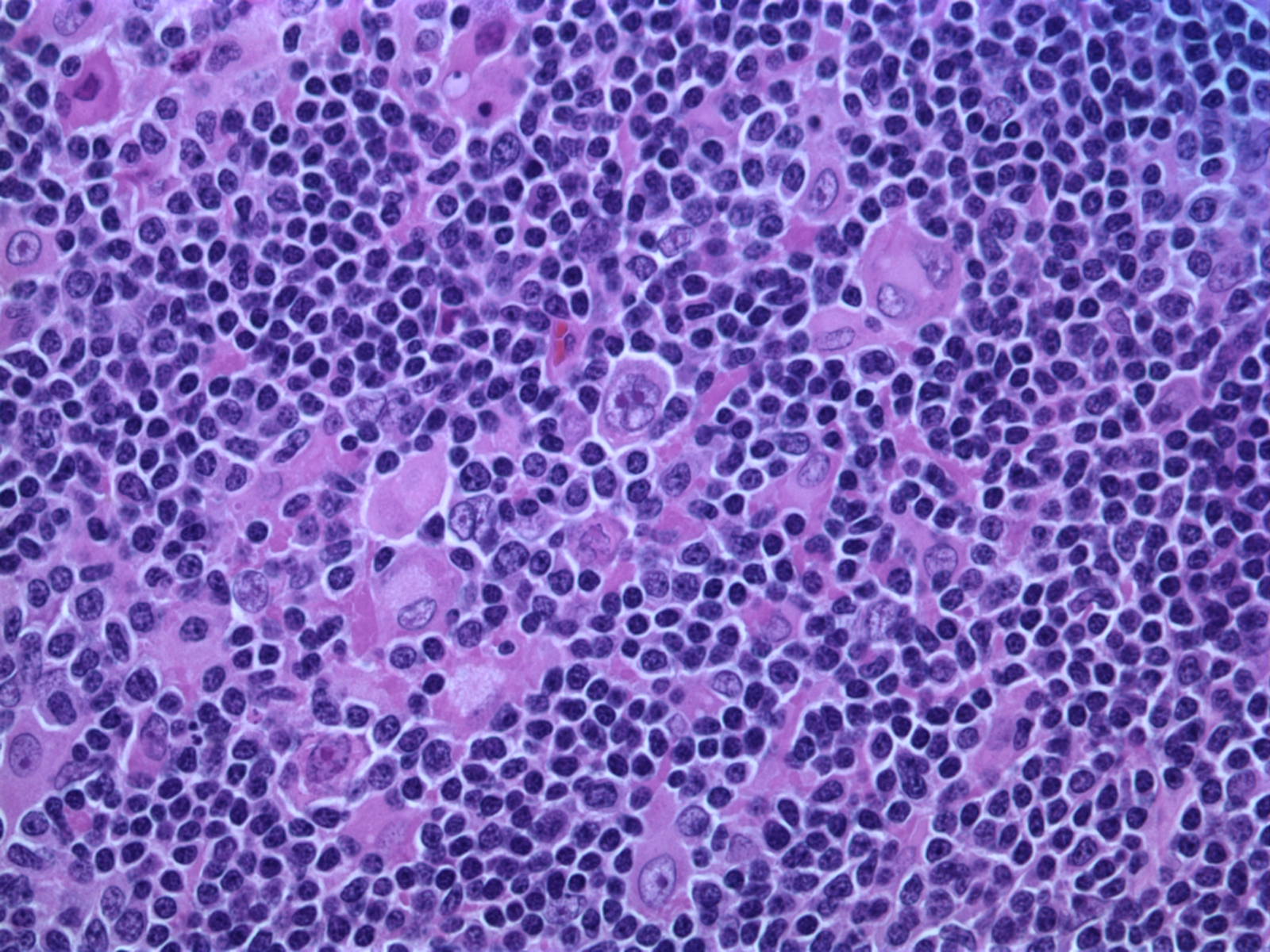
Hodgkin lymphoma, nodular lymphocyte predominant (high power view). Notice the presence of LP cells, also known as "popcorn cells". (H&E)

The characteristics of NLPHL differ from classical Hodgkin lymphoma (cHL). Lymphocyte predominant (LP) ("popcorn") cells are present embedded in nodules consisting of B cells and other reactive cells (mainly reactive T cells). Reed-Sternberg and Hodgkin (RSH) cells are rarely seen, and immunohistochemistry shows a different pattern on the malignant cells; RSH cells typically express CD15 and CD30, whereas LP cells lack expression of these markers, but express B cell markers like CD20, CD22, and CD79a and also express the common leukocyte antigen CD45, which is uncommon on RSH cells. The LP cells have scant cytoplasm and one folded or multilobated nuclei with prominent, mostly basophilic nucleoli. Expert pathology review of multiple morphologic and immunophenotypic features including the use of immunohistochemistry is essential.

Tumors generally located in the peripheral lymph nodes, which can be detected via PET scan and CT scan.

Ann Arbor staging is used to classify tumors and symptoms. Stage IV disease is very rare.

=== Sex ===
There is a male predominance of NLPHL diagnosis.

=== Early detection ===
Diagnosis usually occurs at an early stage of disease progression.

== Management ==
A treatment guide provided by NCCN Guidelines for Patients is available, while the NCCN Clinical Practice Guidelines in Oncology provides a reference for clinicians. Any proposed therapeutic strategy must have minimal acute and long-term toxicities.

=== Watchful waiting ===
Watchful waiting (watch and wait) is defined as a period of observation of at least 3 months without any treatment.

=== Surgical excision ===
Surgical lymph node excision may be carried out at the time of diagnosis in certain cases such in children diagnosed at an early stage of progression. One study found sustained complete remission in half of the cases with a watch-and-wait strategy after surgical lymph node excision at the time of diagnosis.

=== Radiation therapy ===
Studies indicate that radiation therapy (radio therapy) may reduce the risk of progression in adults. In one study, stage I–II patients treated with radiation therapy showed 10-year cause-specific survival of 98%, and the rate of developing radiotherapy-related second malignancies was not increased by the treatment (1% after 10 years). A study published in 2013 on large group of patients with early-stage NLPHL indicated support for using limited-field radiation therapy as the sole treatment of early-stage disease. In a study of 1,162 NLPHL patients from the Surveillance, Epidemiology and End Results (SEER) cancer registry program, radiation therapy improved overall survival and disease specific survival. Recent management strategies recommend that Stage IA NLPHL without clinical risk factors should be treated with limited-field radiotherapy alone.

=== Immunotherapy ===
An example antibody for use in immunotherapy is Rituximab. Rituximab has specific use in treatment of NLPHL as it is a chimeric monoclonal antibody against the protein CD20. Studies indicate Rituximab offers potential in relapsed or refractory patients, and also in front-line treatment especially in advanced stages. Because of a tendency for relapse, maintenance treatment such as every 6 months for 2 years is suggested. Rituximab has been shown to improve patient outcomes after histological transformation.

=== Chemotherapy ===
Possible options such as anthracycline-containing regimens include ABVD, BEACOPP and CHOP. Results of a trial with COPP/ABV in children suggested positive results with chemotherapy alone are possible without the need for radiation therapy. Optimal chemotherapy is a topic for debate, for example there is evidence of support for treatment with R-CHOP instead of ABVD, results showing high rates (40%) of relapse after 10 years since ABVD chemotherapy. BEACOPP has higher reported toxicity risk.

=== Combined treatment ===
One study reported combined radiation therapy (radio therapy) and antibody Rituximab. R-CHOP optionally followed by radiation therapy is recommended in newly diagnosed late stage disease, while for early stage disease radio therapy alone (stage IA without risk factors) or a brief ABVD-based chemotherapy followed by radiation therapy (early stages other than stage IA without risk factors) was advised.

== Prognosis ==
Prognosis is favourable in comparison with classic HL despite a tendency for disease recurrence requiring long term followup. Relapse can occur at a comparatively late stage in comparison to classic HL. There is limited information regarding the outcome for patients with advanced-stage progression.

=== Ethnicity ===
One study in the United States has suggested improved overall survival in response to chemotherapy for African Americans.

=== Histological transformation ===
Histologic transformation to diffuse large B-cell lymphoma (DLBCL) can occur in up to 12% of cases. After transformation, neoplastic cells carry monoclonal immunoglobulin gene rearrangements. Histological transformation may lead to poor prognosis and therefore repeat biopsy is required at relapse. One study found a transformation rate of 7.6%, and suggested that prior exposure to chemotherapy and a presentation with splenic involvement were associated with increased risks of transformation.

== See also ==
- Progressive transformation of germinal centers
