= Immunophenotyping =

Classifying cells of the immune system

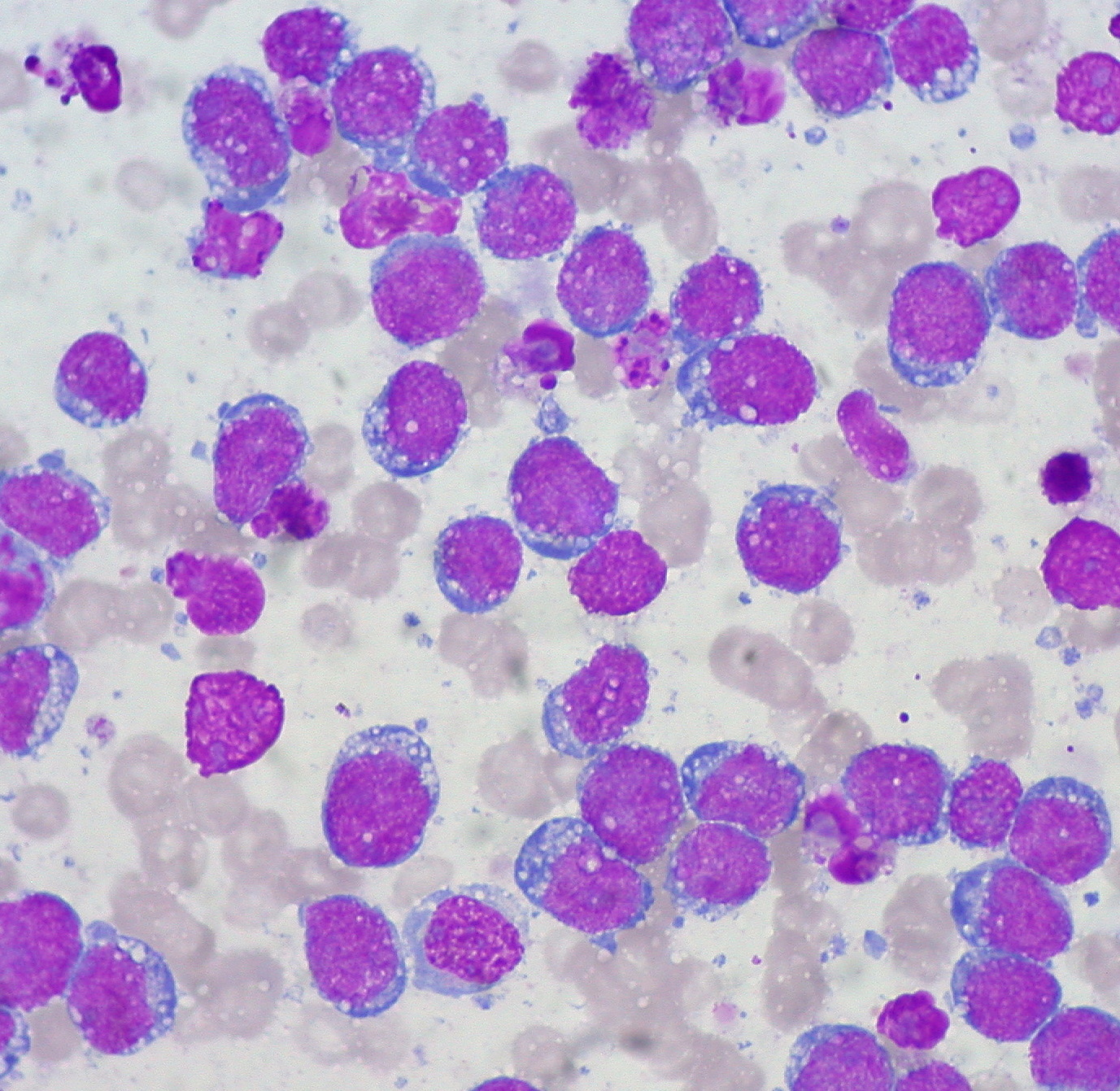
On immunophenotyping by flow cytometry this FNA specimen was positive for CD10, CD20, and kappa sIg; negative for CD5 and lambda sIg.

Immunophenotyping is a technique used to study the protein expressed by cells. This technique is commonly used in basic science research and laboratory diagnostic purpose. This can be done on tissue section (fresh or fixed tissue), cell suspension, etc. An example is the detection of tumor markers, such as in the diagnosis of leukemia. It involves the labelling of white blood cells with antibodies directed against surface proteins on their membrane. By choosing appropriate antibodies, the differentiation of leukemic cells can be accurately determined. The labelled cells are processed in a flow cytometer, a laser-based instrument capable of analyzing thousands of cells per second. The whole procedure can be performed on cells from the blood, bone marrow or spinal fluid in a matter of a few hours.

Immunophenotyping is a very common flow cytometry test in which fluorophore-conjugated antibodies are used as probes for staining target cells with high avidity and affinity. This technique allows rapid and easy phenotyping of each cell in a heterogeneous sample according to the presence or absence of a protein combination.
