= Pirtobrutinib =

Chemical compound

Clinical data
- Trade names: Jaypirca
- Other names: LOXO-305
- AHFS/Drugs.com: Monograph
- MedlinePlus: a623012
- License data: US DailyMed: Pirtobrutinib
- Routes of administration: By mouth
- Drug class: Protein kinase inhibitor
- ATC code: L01EL05 (WHO)

Legal status
- Legal status: CA: ℞-only; US: ℞-only; EU: Rx-only

Identifiers
- IUPAC name: 5-amino-3-(4-{[(5-fluoro-2-methoxybenzoyl)amino]methyl}phenyl)-1-((2S)-1,1,1-trifluoropropan-2-yl)pyrazole-4-carboxamide
- CAS Number: 2101700-15-4
- PubChem CID: 129269915
- DrugBank: DB17472
- ChemSpider: 114875989
- UNII: JNA39I7ZVB
- KEGG: D12050
- ChEBI: CHEBI:229212
- ChEMBL: ChEMBL4650485
- PDB ligand: Y7W (PDBe, RCSB PDB)

Chemical and physical data
- Formula: C_{22}H_{21}F_{4}N_{5}O_{3}
- Molar mass: 479.436 g·mol^{−1}
- 3D model (JSmol): Interactive image
- SMILES: COc1ccc(F)cc1C(=O)NCc1ccc(-c2nn([C@@H](C)C(F)(F)F)c(N)c2C(N)=O)cc1
- InChI: InChI=1S/C22H21F4N5O3/c1-11(22(24,25)26)31-19(27)17(20(28)32)18(30-31)13-5-3-12(4-6-13)10-29-21(33)15-9-14(23)7-8-16(15)34-2/h3-9,11H,10,27H2,1-2H3,(H2,28,32)(H,29,33)/t11-/m0/s1; Key:FWZAWAUZXYCBKZ-NSHDSACASA-N

Pirtobrutinib, sold under the brand name Jaypirca, is an anti-cancer medication that is used to treat mantle cell lymphoma. It inhibits B cell lymphocyte proliferation and survival by binding and inhibiting Bruton's tyrosine kinase (BTK). It is taken by mouth.

The most common adverse reactions include fatigue, musculoskeletal pain, diarrhea, edema, dyspnea, pneumonia, and bruising. The most common adverse reactions when used to treat chronic lymphocytic leukemia or small lymphocytic leukemia include fatigue, bruising, cough, musculoskeletal pain, COVID-19, diarrhea, pneumonia, abdominal pain, dyspnea, hemorrhage, edema, nausea, pyrexia, and headache.

Pirtobrutinib was approved for medical use in the United States in January 2023, and in the European Union in November 2023.

== Medical uses ==
In the United States, pirtobrutinib is indicated to treat relapsed or refractory mantle cell lymphoma after at least two lines of systemic therapy, including a Bruton's tyrosine kinase (BTK) inhibitor. In December 2023, the US Food and Drug Administration (FDA) expanded the indication for pirtobrutinib to include the treatment of adults with chronic lymphocytic leukemia or small lymphocytic leukemia who have received at least two prior lines of therapy, including a BTK inhibitor and a BCL-2 inhibitor. In December 2025, the FDA granted traditional approval for that indication.

In the European Union, pirtobrutinib is indicated for the treatment of mantle cell lymphoma.

== Mechanism of action ==
B cells are white cells of the lymphocyte subtype that produce antibodies, but when some of them grow uncontrollably they can be a cause of cancer. A key enzyme in B cell stimulation and survival is BTK, and pirtobrutinib inhibits BTK in a way that is different from the prototypical BTK inhibitor ibrutinib by binding in a different way that avoids a genetic change (mutation at active site cysteine residue C481 in BTK) that can make some tumors less responsive to ibrutinib.

== History ==
Pirtobrutinib is manufactured by Eli Lilly and Company and was approved by the US Food and Drug Administration in January 2023, for the treatment of mantle cell lymphoma that has become refractory to other BTK inhibitors.

Efficacy was evaluated in BRUIN (NCT03740529), an open-label, multicenter, single-arm trial of pirtobrutinib monotherapy that included 120 participants with mantle cell lymphoma previously treated with a Bruton's tyrosine kinase (BTK) inhibitor. Participants had a median of three prior lines of therapy, with 93% having two or more prior lines. The most common prior Bruton's tyrosine kinase inhibitors received were ibrutinib (67%), acalabrutinib (30%), and zanubrutinib (8%); 83% had discontinued their last Bruton's tyrosine kinase inhibitor due to refractory or progressive disease. The trial was conducted at 49 sites in 10 countries in the United States, Europe, Australia, and Asia. The same trial was used to assess safety and efficacy.

Efficacy was evaluated in BRUIN (NCT03740529], an open-label, international, single-arm, multicohort trial that included 108 participants with chronic lymphocytic leukemia or small lymphocytic lymphoma previously treated with at least two prior lines of therapy, including a Bruton's tyrosine kinase (BTK) inhibitor and a B-cell lymphoma-2 (BCL-2) inhibitor. Participants received a median of five prior lines of therapy (range: 2 to 11). Seventy-seven percent of participants discontinued the last BTK inhibitor for refractory or progressive disease. Pirtobrutinib was administered orally at 200 mg once daily and was continued until disease progression or unacceptable toxicity.

== Society and culture ==
=== Legal status ===
In April 2023, the Committee for Medicinal Products for Human Use of the European Medicines Agency adopted a positive opinion, recommending the granting of a conditional marketing authorization for the medicinal product Jaypirca, intended for the treatment of relapsed or refractory mantle cell lymphoma. The applicant for this medicinal product is Eli Lilly Nederland B.V. Pirtobrutinib was authorized for medical use in the European Union in November 2023.
