= John V. Oyler =

American executive

- Born: 1968 (age 57–58); Pittsburgh, Pennsylvania
- Education: Massachusetts Institute of Technology
- Occupation: Entrepreneur
- Known for: BeOne

John V. Oyler (born 1968) is the co-founder and chief executive officer of BeOne Medicines (formerly BeiGene), a biotechnology company focused on oncology.

== Early life and education ==
Oyler grew up in Pittsburgh, Pennsylvania. He graduated from the Massachusetts Institute of Technology with a degree in mechanical engineering. He later earned an MBA from Stanford University.

== Career ==
Oyler began his career as a consultant at McKinsey & Company. In 1998, Oyler co-founded Telephia, a telecom research company. Nielsen Holdings acquired Telephia in 2007.

Following Telephia, Oyler co-founded BioDuro, a contract research organization, which was acquired by PPD in 2009.

In 2010, Oyler co-founded BeOne Medicines with Chinese biochemist Xiaodong Wang. The company has developed oncology medicines, including Tevimbra, a checkpoint inhibitor, and Brukinsa, a Bruton's tyrosine kinase inhibitor. As of 2025, BeOne has 11,000 employees.

== See also ==
- BeiGene
- BeOne Medicines
- Xiaodong Wang (biochemist)
