= Brand Institute =

Branding and name marketing agency

- Industry: Branding
- Founded: 1993
- Founder: James L. Dettore
- Number of locations: 18 offices (2025)
- Area served: Worldwide
- Key people: James L. Dettore; William T. Johnson; Todd Bridges; Jerry Phillips; Sophia Fuerst
- Services: Name Development; Trademark Screening; Market Research; Name Safety Research; Linguistic Screening; Visual Identity; Regulatory Services
- Subsidiaries: Drug Safety Institute
- Website: www.brandinstitute.com

Brand Institute is a branding agency that specializes in the development of brand names and identities. The company's primary services include creative name development, trademark screening, market research, regulatory affairs, linguistic analysis, and graphic design (e.g., logos and websites). It is best known for pharmaceutical naming, partnering with manufacturers on approximately 75% of drug names approved every year. Its first drug naming project was with Wyeth on the anti-obesity drug Redux.

Brand Institute was founded in 1993 by James (Jim) L. Dettore. Prior to forming Brand Institute, he worked for the multinational corporations PepsiCo, Hilton International Hotels and Ralph Lauren, the advertising agency J. Walter Thompson and the brand consultancy Interbrand.

In 2004, the company formed the subsidiary, Drug Safety Institute (DSI), which consults the company's pharmaceutical clients on best practices in drug product naming, packaging, and labeling. Jerry Phillips, the former director of the FDA's Division of Medication Errors and Technical Support (DMETS), and whose responsibilities included approving proprietary drug names while with the FDA, was hired as DSI's president and chief executive officer.

Brand Institute's clients include consumer and business-to-business companies such as AT&T and General Motors, and healthcare companies such as Biogen, Allergan, Johnson & Johnson, Novartis, CSL Behring, Amgen, BeiGene, Avexis, BioMarin, and Horizon Therapeutics. It has named brands such as Lipitor, Clarinex, Sarafem, Allegra, Propecia, Relenza, Climara, Proscar, Invega, Lunesta, Latisse, Entresto, Tremfya, Brineura, Privigen, Zykadia, Tecfidera, Brukinsa, Zolgensma, Xpovio, and Qwo.

Brand Institute notably created and validated the brand name for Pfizer and BioNTech's COVID-19 vaccine, Comirnaty, and its nonproprietary name, tozinameran. Comirnaty was the first COVID-19 vaccine brand name approved by any regulatory agency in the world. Brand Institute also developed the COVID-19 vaccine brand names Spikevax (Moderna), Vaxzevria (AstraZeneca), and Nuvaxovid (Novavax).

Other brands that Brand Institute claims to have worked on include Frappuccino for Starbucks, Britney Spears' Fantasy Twist, BMW's IconicSounds technology, the Fruit of The Loom corporate identity, Coolsculpting, the Lenovo ThinkPad, beverage brands Aquafina, Mountain Dew Baja Blast and Code Red, and Propel water. Other claims include, the movie X-Men Days of Future Past, Bounty, Charmin Basic, Crest Complete, Charmin Ultra Soft, a variety of pet foods, and Colgate lines of toothpaste.

Office Locations

- Basel
- Boston
- Chicago
- Dallas
- Frankfurt
- Miami
- Mumbai
- London
- Los Angeles
- New York City
- Raleigh-Durham
- Rockville, Maryland
- San Francisco
- San Juan
- São Paulo
- Seoul
- Tokyo
- Toronto
