= Brimarafenib =

Clinical data
- Other names: BGB-3245

Identifiers
- IUPAC name: 1-[(1S,1aS,6bS)-5-[(7-oxo-6,8-dihydro-5H-1,8-naphthyridin-4-yl)oxy]-1a,6b-dihydro-1H-cyclopropa[b][1]benzofuran-1-yl]-3-(2,4,5-trifluorophenyl)urea
- CAS Number: 1643326-82-2
- PubChem CID: 117807031
- IUPHAR/BPS: 13203
- ChemSpider: 129144353
- UNII: GXS33OY2CB

Chemical and physical data
- Formula: C_{24}H_{17}F_{3}N_{4}O_{4}
- Molar mass: 482.419 g·mol^{−1}
- 3D model (JSmol): Interactive image
- SMILES: C1CC(=O)NC2=NC=CC(=C21)OC3=CC4=C(C=C3)O[C@H]5[C@@H]4[C@@H]5NC(=O)NC6=CC(=C(C=C6F)F)F
- InChI: InChI=InChI=1S/C24H17F3N4O4/c25-13-8-15(27)16(9-14(13)26)29-24(33)31-21-20-12-7-10(1-3-17(12)35-22(20)21)34-18-5-6-28-23-11(18)2-4-19(32)30-23/h1,3,5-9,20-22H,2,4H2,(H,28,30,32)(H2,29,31,33)/t20-,21-,22-/m0/s1; Key:USMWOBMHNWNPAP-FKBYEOEOSA-N

Brimarafenib is an investigational new drug that is being evaluated for the treatment of cancer. It targets the proto-oncogene BRAF with activating mutations BRAF mutations (such as V600E), non-V600 BRAF mutations, and RAF fusions.

It is being developed by MapKure, LLC, a joint venture between SpringWorks Therapeutics and BeiGene.
