= Orelabrutinib =

Drug for treatment of cancer

Clinical data
- Trade names: 宜诺凯 (China), Hibruka (Singapore)
- Other names: ICP-022; ICP022
- Drug class: Bruton's tyrosine kinase inhibitor
- ATC code: L01EL04 (WHO)

Legal status
- Legal status: In general: ℞ (Prescription only)

Identifiers
- IUPAC name: 2-(4-Phenoxyphenyl)-6-(1-prop-2-enoylpiperidin-4-yl)pyridine-3-carboxamide
- CAS Number: 1655504-04-3
- PubChem CID: 91667513
- IUPHAR/BPS: 10629
- DrugBank: DB16272
- ChemSpider: 82956396
- UNII: WJA5UO9E10
- KEGG: D12160
- ChEBI: CHEBI:758220
- ChEMBL: ChEMBL4650321

Chemical and physical data
- Formula: C_{26}H_{25}N_{3}O_{3}
- Molar mass: 427.504 g·mol^{−1}
- 3D model (JSmol): Interactive image
- SMILES: C=CC(=O)N1CCC(CC1)C2=NC(=C(C=C2)C(=O)N)C3=CC=C(C=C3)OC4=CC=CC=C4
- InChI: InChI=1S/C26H25N3O3/c1-2-24(30)29-16-14-18(15-17-29)23-13-12-22(26(27)31)25(28-23)19-8-10-21(11-9-19)32-20-6-4-3-5-7-20/h2-13,18H,1,14-17H2,(H2,27,31); Key:MZPVEMOYADUARK-UHFFFAOYSA-N

Orelabrutinib is a small molecule inhibitor of Bruton's tyrosine kinase used for the treatment of mantle cell lymphoma, chronic lymphocytic leukemia/small lymphocytic lymphoma, and marginal zone lymphoma.

In China, it is approved for patients with mantle cell lymphoma (MCL) and chronic lymphocytic leukemia/small lymphocytic lymphoma (CLL/SLL), who have received at least one treatment in the past.

In Singapore, it is approved for adult patients with relapsed or refractory marginal zone lymphoma (R/R MZL).

Orelabrutinib is an inhibitor of Bruton's tyrosine kinase, thus being a BTK inhibitor.

== Society and culture ==
=== Legal status ===
Orelabrutinib was approved for medical use in China in December 2020.

Orelabrutinib was approved for medical use in Singapore in September 2025.

=== Names ===
Orelabrutinib is the international nonproprietary name.

Orelabrutinib is sold under the brand names 宜诺凯 in China, and Hibruka in Singapore.
