= Rocbrutinib =

Clinical data
- Other names: HS-10561; LP-168; NWP-775

Legal status
- Legal status: investigational

Identifiers
- IUPAC name: N-[5-[[6-[2-(4,4-dimethyl-9-oxo-1,10-diazatricyclo[6.4.0.0^{2,6}]dodeca-2(6),7-dien-10-yl)-3-(hydroxymethyl)-4-pyridinyl]-4-methyl-3-oxopyrazin-2-yl]amino]-2-[(2S)-2-methyl-4-(oxan-4-yl)piperazin-1-yl]phenyl]prop-2-enamide
- CAS Number: 2485861-07-0
- PubChem CID: 139416847
- IUPHAR/BPS: 12875
- DrugBank: DB19445
- ChemSpider: 129309149
- UNII: KD68L3GRW2
- ChEBI: CHEBI:759240
- ChEMBL: ChEMBL5314539

Chemical and physical data
- Formula: C_{42}H_{51}N_{9}O_{5}
- Molar mass: 761.928 g·mol^{−1}
- 3D model (JSmol): Interactive image
- SMILES: C[C@H]1CN(CCN1C2=C(C=C(C=C2)NC3=NC(=CN(C3=O)C)C4=C(C(=NC=C4)N5CCN6C7=C(CC(C7)(C)C)C=C6C5=O)CO)NC(=O)C=C)C8CCOCC8
- InChI: InChI=InChI=1S/C42H51N9O5/c1-6-37(53)45-32-20-28(7-8-34(32)49-14-13-48(23-26(49)2)29-10-17-56-18-11-29)44-38-41(55)47(5)24-33(46-38)30-9-12-43-39(31(30)25-52)51-16-15-50-35(40(51)54)19-27-21-42(3,4)22-36(27)50/h6-9,12,19-20,24,26,29,52H,1,10-11,13-18,21-23,25H2,2-5H3,(H,44,46)(H,45,53)/t26-/m0/s1; Key:OYJVFTNYBWVQHA-SANMLTNESA-N

Rocbrutinib is an investigational new drug that is being evaluated by Newave Pharmaceuticals for the treatment of chronic lymphocytic leukaemia (CLL), diffuse large B cell lymphoma (DLBCL), and mantle cell lymphoma (MCL). It is a Bruton's tyrosine kinase (BTK) inhibitor.

== Pharmacology ==
Rocbrutinib acts both as irreversible BTK inhibitor where its acrylamide reacts with cysteine 481 of BTK. It can also act as a reversible inhibitor of BTK that harbors the resistance C481S mutation.

== Clinical trials ==
Rocbrutinib is currently in phase 3 clinical trials for mantle cell lymphoma.
