= BeOne Medicines =

Global biotechnology company

- Type: Public
- Traded as: Nasdaq: ONC; SEHK: 6160; SSE: 688235
- Founded: 2010; 16 years ago
- Founders: John V. Oyler; Xiaodong Wang
- Headquarters: Cambridge, Massachusetts, U.S.; Beijing, China; Basel, Switzerland
- Revenue: ▲US$5.3 billion (2025)
- Operating income: ▲US$447 million (2025)
- Net income: ▲US$286.9 million (2025)
- Total assets: ▲US$8.18 billion (2025)
- Total equity: ▲US$4.36 billion (2025)
- Number of employees: 12,000 (2026)
- Website: www.beonemedicines.com

BeOne Medicines, formerly known as BeiGene, Ltd. is a multinational oncology company. It specializes in the development of drugs for cancer treatment.

Founded in 2010 by chief executive officer John V. Oyler and Xiaodong Wang, the company is headquartered in Cambridge, Massachusetts and has locations on six continents, in over 45 countries. BeOne has a large presence in the Chinese market.

BeOne Medicines has developed several medicines, including tislelizumab (brand name of Tevimbra), a checkpoint inhibitor, and zanubrutinib (brand name of Brukinsa), a Bruton's tyrosine kinase inhibitor. On 14 November 2024, the company announced its intention to rebrand as BeOne Medicines. BeOne changed its stock ticker to ONC in January 2025 and redomiciled to Basel, Switzerland in May 2025.

== Research and development ==
In addition to clinical research, BeOne's early business model involved obtaining the rights to experimental medicines shelved by other pharmaceutical companies and taking them through early clinical trials at Chinese medical schools and hospitals. Successful formulas would either be sold to or co-developed with larger drugmakers who could fund the late-stage trials.

One of BeOne's internally developed medicines is tislelizumab (BGB-A317), a PD-1 antibody or PD-L1 inhibitor that prevents cancer tumors from evading the immune system. Tislelizumab is being developed as a monotherapy and for use in combination with other therapies for several types of cancer.

Tislelizumab (Tevimbra), is a humanized immunoglobulin G4 (IgG4) anti-programmed cell death protein 1 (PD-1) monoclonal antibody, designed to enhance immune response against tumors while minimizing Fc-gamma (Fcγ) receptor binding on macrophages. The Tevimbra clinical development program has enrolled approximately 14,000 patients in 35 countries.

In December 2019, it was approved by the National Medical Products Administration in China for the treatment of Hodgkin lymphoma.

In 2024, the U.S. FDA approved Tevimbra in combination with platinum and fluoropyrimidine-based chemotherapy for the first-line treatment of unresectable or metastatic HER2-negative gastric or gastroesophageal junction adenocarcinoma in adults whose tumors express PD-L1 (≥1). The European Commission (EC) also approved its use in combination with chemotherapy for the first-line treatment of esophageal squamous cell carcinoma and gastric or gastroesophageal junction adenocarcinoma. On 4 March 2025, BeOne Medicines announced the FDA's approval of Tevimbra for the first-line treatment of advanced esophageal squamous cell carcinoma in combination with chemotherapy. On 31 March 2025, the Committee for Medicinal Products for Human Use (CHMP) of the European Medicines Agency issued a positive opinion recommending approval of Tevimbra (tislelizumab), in combination with etoposide and platinum chemotherapy, as a first-line treatment for adult patients with extensive-stage small cell lung cancer (ES-SCLC).

BeOne also developed Brukinsa (zanubrutinib), a Bruton's tyrosine kinase inhibitor for the treatment of cancer, from a formula its scientists created in Beijing in 2012. In November 2019, zanubrutinib became the first cancer drug developed in China to gain FDA approval; it received accelerated approval for the treatment of mantle cell lymphoma (MCL), a rare and aggressive form of non-Hodgkin lymphoma. In June 2020, the drug was also approved in China for the treatment of MCL, chronic lymphocytic leukemia (CLL), and small lymphocytic lymphoma (SLL); it was then approved for the treatment of CLL and SLL by the European Commission in November 2022 and by the FDA for the same indications in January 2023. In September 2021, the FDA approved zanubrutinib to treat adults with Waldenström's macroglobulinemia, a rare non-Hodgkin lymphoma. As of 2026, Brukinsa dominates the company's revenue, generating $1.2 billion out of $1.7 billion in revenue reported in a Q2 earnings call.

In 2023, Brukinsa, the Bruton's tyrosine kinase inhibitor crossed blockbuster threshold to hit 1.3 billion dollars in full-year sales with the majority of product sales originating in the United States and Europe. Brukinsa is the only BTK inhibitor to demonstrate PFS superiority in a head-to-head comparison of BTK inhibitors. The FDA approved a label update for Brukinsa in 2023 which includes superior PFS results from the Phase 3 ALPINE head-to-head trial versus Imbruvica in relapsed/refractory CLL.

At the 2024 American Society of Hematology (ASH) Annual Meeting, researchers presented 5-year follow-up data from the SEQUOIA trial, a Phase 3 study comparing zanubrutinib to bendamustine-rituximab in treatment-naïve chronic lymphocytic leukemia (CLL) patients. After adjusting for COVID-19-related disruptions, the study reported a 75% reduction in the risk of disease progression or death with zanubrutinib.

== History ==
BeOne was founded in late 2010 by John V. Oyler, an American entrepreneur who serves as the company's chief executive officer and chairman, alongside Xiaodong Wang, a Chinese American biochemist. Oyler and Wang envisioned a global multinational biopharmaceutical company focusing on cancer treatment. Xiaodong Wang is former Howard Hughes Medical Investigator at the University of Texas Southwestern Medical Center. The company initially primarily operated in China.

John Oyler provided part of the initial seed money and also received early backing from the American pharmaceutical company Merck & Co. BeOne established offices in Philadelphia and at Zhongguancun Life Science Park near the National Institute of Biological Sciences, Beijing where Wang serves as director. Merck invested $20 million in BeOne in 2011.

On 2 February 2016, BeOne had its first initial public offering (IPO) of 6.6 million shares priced at $24 on the Nasdaq Stock Market under the ticker symbol BGNE. The company raised $182 million. The IPO, managed by Goldman Sachs and Morgan Stanley, was backed by Baker Brothers and Hillhouse BGN Holdings, which together planned to purchase half the shares offered. In a March 2018 follow-on offering, BeOne raised another $758 million. In August 2018, the company had another IPO when it offered a secondary listing of its shares on the Hong Kong Stock Exchange, raising $903 million in the process.

In July 2017, BeOne entered into a partnership with Celgene to continue the development and commercialization of the cancer drug BGB-A317, also known as tislelizumab. BeOne also acquired Celgene's operations in China as well as the rights to commercialize Abraxane, Revlimid and Vidaza, Celgene's approved drugs in China. As part of the deal, Celgene made a $150 million equity investment in BeOne and acquired the rights for the sale of tislelizumab overseas for $263 million, with another $980 million plus royalties contingent on future sales. The deal stipulated that, if Celgene began work on a competitor drug, BeOne could buy back the rights to tislelizumab. In January 2019, Celgene was acquired by Bristol-Myers Squibb, which is developing a similar cancer immunotherapy drug, Opdivo, allowing BeOne to regain its overseas rights to tislelizumab. Celgene returned the rights to the drug in June 2019 along with a payment of $150 million to conclude the deal.

In 2019, Amgen Inc. acquired 20.5% of BeOne in a deal valued at $2.7 billion, and gained a seat on BeOne's board of directors. In turn, BeOne acquired the rights to commercialize three Amgen pharmaceuticals, Xgeva, Kyprolis, and Blincyto, as well as 20 others in development, investing up to $1.25 billion toward their research.

In May 2021, BeOne and Asieris Pharmaceuticals worked together to assess the efficacy and quality of Asieris's MetAP2 inhibitor and BeOne's PD-L1 inhibitor for bladder cancer patients. Novartis returned the rights to tislelizumab to BeOne in September 2023.

BeOne opened several new offices around the world in 2022, including a regional office in Basel, Switzerland, which serves as a hub for the company's operations in Europe. As of 2022, the company had enrolled patients from more than 45 countries, including 25 European countries, in clinical trials. BeOne also opened a new office in Sydney, Australia, in 2022, although it conducted its first research in the country in 2014. The company has become one of the largest clinical research organizations in Australia. In fact, all first-in-human phase 1 trials of internally discovered assets at BeOne are conducted in Australia.

== Controversy ==
In 2024, a senior executive at the company, then called BeiGene, was under investigation by Chinese anti-smuggling authorities, reportedly due to her previous 15-year tenure at AstraZeneca.

As of May 2026, the company is in active litigation since 2024 in a U.S. federal district court in Illinois against AbbVie, an American company based there, which alleges the company has stolen trade secrets from it.

Its United States subsidiary has received multiple warnings from the Food and Drug Administration regarding misleading advertisements, including letters from January 2026 and May 2026 regarding advertisements for the blood cancer drug Brukinsa, and a December 2025 letter regarding Microsoft Teams backgrounds for the esophageal cancer drug Tevimbra which failed to include required risk information.
