= Docirbrutinib =

Clinical data
- Other names: AS-1763

Identifiers
- IUPAC name: 2-[3-[2-amino-6-[1-(oxetan-3-yl)-3,6-dihydro-2H-pyridin-4-yl]-7H-pyrrolo[2,3-d]pyrimidin-4-yl]-2-(hydroxymethyl)phenyl]-6-cyclopropyl-8-fluoroisoquinolin-1-one;methanesulfonic acid
- CAS Number: 2659241-06-0
- PubChem CID: 171390006
- ChemSpider: 129431709
- UNII: 3J6FQ6W4NQ
- KEGG: D13143

Chemical and physical data
- Formula: C_{35}H_{39}FN_{6}O_{9}S_{2}
- Molar mass: 770.85 g·mol^{−1}
- 3D model (JSmol): Interactive image
- SMILES: CS(=O)(=O)O.CS(=O)(=O)O.C1CC1C2=CC(=C3C(=C2)C=CN(C3=O)C4=CC=CC(=C4CO)C5=C6C=C(NC6=NC(=N5)N)C7=CCN(CC7)C8COC8)F
- InChI: InChI=InChI=1S/C33H31FN6O3.2CH4O3S/c34-26-13-21(18-4-5-18)12-20-8-11-40(32(42)29(20)26)28-3-1-2-23(25(28)15-41)30-24-14-27(36-31(24)38-33(35)37-30)19-6-9-39(10-7-19)22-16-43-17-22;2*1-5(2,3)4/h1-3,6,8,11-14,18,22,41H,4-5,7,9-10,15-17H2,(H3,35,36,37,38);2*1H3,(H,2,3,4); Key:KMLXYMRUQMJKLA-UHFFFAOYSA-N

Docirbrutinib is an investigational new drug that is being evaluated for the treatment of cancer. It is a selective Bruton's tyrosine kinase (BTK) inhibitor that targets chronic lymphocytic leukemia (CLL) and other B-cell malignancies.
