= Bexobrutideg =

Identifiers
- IUPAC name: 3-[4-[1-[[1-[6-[[(3S)-2,6-dioxopiperidin-3-yl]carbamoyl]-3-pyridinyl]piperidin-4-yl]methyl]piperidin-4-yl]anilino]-5-[(3R)-3-(3-methyl-2-oxoimidazolidin-1-yl)piperidin-1-yl]pyrazine-2-carboxamide
- CAS Number: 2649400-34-8
- PubChem CID: 156464216
- ChemSpider: 129152315
- UNII: HVD6HGW6JD
- KEGG: D13115

Chemical and physical data
- Formula: C_{42}H_{54}N_{12}O_{5}
- Molar mass: 806.973 g·mol^{−1}
- 3D model (JSmol): Interactive image
- SMILES: CN1CCN(C1=O)[C@@H]2CCCN(C2)C3=CN=C(C(=N3)NC4=CC=C(C=C4)C5CCN(CC5)CC6CCN(CC6)C7=CN=C(C=C7)C(=O)N[C@H]8CCC(=O)NC8=O)C(=O)N
- InChI: InChI=InChI=1S/C42H54N12O5/c1-50-21-22-54(42(50)59)32-3-2-16-53(26-32)35-24-45-37(38(43)56)39(48-35)46-30-6-4-28(5-7-30)29-14-17-51(18-15-29)25-27-12-19-52(20-13-27)31-8-9-33(44-23-31)40(57)47-34-10-11-36(55)49-41(34)58/h4-9,23-24,27,29,32,34H,2-3,10-22,25-26H2,1H3,(H2,43,56)(H,46,48)(H,47,57)(H,49,55,58)/t32-,34+/m1/s1; Key:HPTPDBYCFHFWJG-CWTKIQHKSA-N

Bexobrutideg (NX-5948) is an investigational new drug that is being evaluated by Nurix Therapeutics for the treatment of relapsed and refractory B-cell malignancies, including chronic lymphocytic leukemia (CLL) and Waldenström macroglobulinemia. It is an orally bioavailable, brain-penetrant Bruton's tyrosine kinase degrader.
