= Acalabrutinib =

Chemical compound

Clinical data
- Trade names: Calquence
- Other names: ACP-196
- AHFS/Drugs.com: Monograph
- MedlinePlus: a618004
- License data: US DailyMed: Acalabrutinib
- Pregnancy category: AU: C
- Routes of administration: By mouth
- ATC code: L01EL02 (WHO)

Legal status
- Legal status: AU: S4 (Prescription only); CA: ℞-only; US: ℞-only; EU: Rx-only

Identifiers
- IUPAC name: 4-{8-amino-3-[(2S)-1-(2-butynoyl)pyrrolidin-2-yl]imidazo[1,5-a]pyrazin-1-yl}-N-(pyridin-2-yl)benzamide
- CAS Number: 1420477-60-6
- PubChem CID: 71226662
- DrugBank: DB11703
- ChemSpider: 36764951
- UNII: I42748ELQW
- KEGG: D10893
- ChEBI: CHEBI:167707
- ChEMBL: ChEMBL3707348
- PDB ligand: XQQ (PDBe, RCSB PDB)
- ECHA InfoCard: 100.247.121

Chemical and physical data
- Formula: C_{26}H_{23}N_{7}O_{2}
- Molar mass: 465.517 g·mol^{−1}
- 3D model (JSmol): Interactive image
- SMILES: CC#CC(=O)N1CCC[C@H]1c1nc(-c2ccc(C(=O)Nc3ccccn3)cc2)c2c(N)nccn12
- InChI: InChI=1S/C26H23N7O2/c1-2-6-21(34)32-15-5-7-19(32)25-31-22(23-24(27)29-14-16-33(23)25)17-9-11-18(12-10-17)26(35)30-20-8-3-4-13-28-20/h3-4,8-14,16,19H,5,7,15H2,1H3,(H2,27,29)(H,28,30,35)/t19-/m0/s1; Key:WDENQIQQYWYTPO-IBGZPJMESA-N

Acalabrutinib, sold under the brand name Calquence, is an anti-cancer medication used to treat various types of non-Hodgkin lymphoma, including mantle cell lymphoma and chronic lymphocytic leukemia/small lymphocytic lymphoma. It may be used both in relapsed as well as in treatment-naive settings.

Common side effects include headaches, feeling tired, low red blood cells, low platelets, and low white blood cells. It is a second generation Bruton's tyrosine kinase inhibitor. Acalabrutinib blocks an enzyme called Bruton's tyrosine kinase, which helps B cells to survive and grow. By blocking this enzyme, acalabrutinib is expected to slow down the build-up of cancerous B cells in chronic lymphocytic leukemia, thereby delaying progression of the cancer.

Acalabrutinib was approved for medical use in the United States in 2017, and in the European Union in November 2020.

== Medical uses ==
In the European Union, acalabrutinib as monotherapy or in combination with obinutuzumab is indicated for the treatment of adults with previously untreated chronic lymphocytic leukaemia. It is also indicated for the treatment of adults with chronic lymphocytic leukaemia who have received at least one prior therapy.

In the United States, acalabrutinib is indicated for the treatment of adults with mantle cell lymphoma who have received at least one prior therapy, and for the treatment of adults with chronic lymphocytic leukemia or small lymphocytic lymphoma. In January 2025, the US Food and Drug Administration (FDA) granted traditional approval to acalabrutinib, in combination with bendamustine and rituximab, for the treatment of adults with previously untreated mantle cell lymphoma who are ineligible for autologous hematopoietic stem cell transplantation. The FDA also granted traditional approval to acalabrutinib as a single agent for adults with previously treated mantle cell lymphoma. Acalabrutinib received accelerated approval for this indication in 2017.

== Side effects ==
The most common adverse events were headache, diarrhea and weight gain. Despite the appearance of a greater occurrence of transient headaches, data suggest a preferred advantage of acalabrutinib over ibrutinib due to expected reduced adverse events of skin rash, severe diarrhea, and bleeding risk.

== History ==
The efficacy of using acalabrutinib, in combination with bendamustine and rituximab, was evaluated in ECHO (NCT02972840), a randomized, double-blind, placebo controlled, multicenter trial in 598 participants with untreated mantle cell lymphoma who were ≥65 years of age and not intended to receive hematopoietic stem cell transplantation. Participants were randomized (1:1) to receive acalabrutinib plus bendamustine and rituximab or placebo plus bendamustine and rituximab. The US Food and Drug Administration (FDA) granted the application for acalabrutinib, in combination with bendamustine and rituximab, priority review and orphan drug designations.

== Society and culture ==
=== Legal status ===
Acalabrutinib was approved for medical use in the United States in 2017, and in the European Union in November 2020.

As of February 2016, acalabrutinib had received orphan drug designation in the United States for mantle cell lymphoma and chronic lymphocytic leukemia, and was similarly designated as an orphan medicinal product by the European Medicines Agency (EMA) Committee for Orphan Medicinal Products (COMP) for treatment of three indications: chronic lymphocytic leukemia/small lymphocytic lymphoma, mantle cell lymphoma, and lymphoplasmacytic lymphoma (Waldenström's macroglobulinaemia). Approval would result in a 10-year period of market exclusivity for the stated indications within Europe.

=== Economics ===
It was developed by Acerta Pharma. After promising results for chronic lymphocytic leukemia in initial clinical trials, Astra Zeneca purchased a 55% stake in Acerta Pharma for $4 billion in December 2015, with an option to acquire the remaining 45% stake for an additional $3 billion, conditional on approval in both the US and Europe and the establishment of commercial opportunity. AstraZeneca purchased the remainder of Acerta Pharma in 2021.

=== Names ===
Acalabrutinib is the international nonproprietary name (INN), and the United States Adopted Name (USAN).

== Research ==
Relative to ibrutinib, acalabrutinib demonstrated higher selectivity and inhibition of the targeted activity of BTK, while having a much greater IC_{50} or otherwise virtually no inhibition on the kinase activities of ITK, EGFR, ERBB2, ERBB4, JAK3, BLK, FGR, FYN, HCK, LCK, LYN, SRC, and YES1. In addition, in platelets treated with ibrutinib, thrombus formation was clearly inhibited while no impact to thrombus formation was identified relative to controls for those treated with acalabrutinib. These findings strongly suggest an improved safety profile of acalabrutinib with minimized adverse effects relative to ibrutinib. In pre-clinical studies, it was shown to be more potent and selective than ibrutinib, the first-in-class BTK inhibitor.

The interim results of the still on-going first human phase I/II clinical trial (NCT02029443) with 61 patients for the treatment of relapsed chronic lymphocytic leukemia are encouraging, with a 95% overall response rate demonstrating potential to become a best-in-class treatment for chronic lymphocytic leukemia. Notably, a 100% response rate was achieved for those people which were positive for the 17p13.1 gene deletion, a subgroup that typically results in a poor response to therapy and expected outcomes.
