= Nemtabrutinib =

Chemical compound

Clinical data
- Other names: MK-1026; ARQ 531

Legal status
- Legal status: Investigational

Identifiers
- IUPAC name: (2-chloro-4-phenoxyphenyl)-(4-{[(3R,6S)-6-(hydroxymethyl)oxan-3-yl]amino}-7H-pyrrolo[2,3-d]pyrimidin-5-yl)methanone
- CAS Number: 2095393-15-8
- PubChem CID: 129045720
- UNII: JTZ51LIXN4
- PDB ligand: HRA (PDBe, RCSB PDB)

Chemical and physical data
- Formula: C_{25}H_{23}ClN_{4}O_{4}
- Molar mass: 478.93 g·mol^{−1}
- 3D model (JSmol): Interactive image
- SMILES: O=C(c1ccc(Oc2ccccc2)cc1Cl)c1c[nH]c2ncnc(N[C@@H]3CC[C@@H](CO)OC3)c12
- InChI: InChI=1S/C25H23ClN4O4/c26-21-10-17(34-16-4-2-1-3-5-16)8-9-19(21)23(32)20-11-27-24-22(20)25(29-14-28-24)30-15-6-7-18(12-31)33-13-15/h1-5,8-11,14-15,18,31H,6-7,12-13H2,(H2,27,28,29,30)/t15-,18+/m1/s1; Key:JSFCZQSJQXFJDS-QAPCUYQASA-N

Nemtabrutinib (MK-1026, formerly ARQ 531) is a small molecule drug is a Bruton's tyrosine kinase (BTK) inhibitor; unlike first generation BTK inhibitors it does not bind covalently, and inhibits the ATP binding site of BTK, and was designed to inhibit Src family kinases and kinases related to ERK signalling, along with BTK.

Merck paid $2.7 billion to acquire the company ArQule and the drug, which at the time had just completed a Phase I clinical trial as a treatment for B-cell cancers. As of December 2024 Merck had started Phase III trials in chronic lymphocytic leukaemia and other blood cancers, and had finished a Phase I trial for kidney disease.
