= Immunotransplant =

Immunotransplant is a maneuver used to make vaccines more powerful. It refers to the process of infusing vaccine-primed T lymphocytes into lymphodepleted recipients for the purpose of enhancing the proliferation and function of those T cells and increasing immune protection induced by that vaccine.

The concept takes advantage of data from animal and studies in vaccinology and the homeostasis of T cells and has applications in the treatment of infectious disease, immunodeficiency syndromes, and cancer.

== Basic Immunology ==
=== Vaccines ===
Historically, the effect of vaccines -particularly against pathogens- has been assessed by measurement of their induction of a B-cell-mediated -or humoral- immune response, i.e. the production of pathogen-specific antibodies. In the study of both infectious diseases and cancer, a majority of potential immune targets are only expressed intra-cellularly, and are thus inaccessible to antibody-mediated elimination. T-cell mediated immunity, by contrast, has the potential to recognize targets expressed either extra- or intra-cellularly and has therefore been studied extensively for treatment of these diseases.

A number of pre-clinical and clinical studies have demonstrated that vaccines against pathogens, bystander (non-pathogenic) proteins, tumor-associated antigens, or whole tumor cells, can induce specific T-cell mediated immune responses. A number of approaches have been considered to amplify T cell mediated immune responses(e.g. IL-2, CTLA-4, IL-7, CD137), and some of these have shown clinical efficacy in eliminating particular types of cancer, most notably melanoma and renal cell carcinoma.

=== T-Cell Homeostasis and Homeostatic Proliferation ===
The use of immunotransplant to enhance T cell-mediated immune responses, derive from studies of T cell homeostasis. The total cohort of T cells in an organism maintain homeostasis – a consistent total number of T cells in the peripheral blood. Transient elevations in peripheral blood T cell counts cause the whole population to diminish, transient depletions cause the whole population to proliferate, generally maintaining a roughly total T cell count. The latter situation –lymphodepletion– has been studied extensively and the proliferation of mature T cells upon transfer into the lymphopenic host is referred to as “lymphodepletion-induced” or “homeostatic” proliferation. It has been shown that homeostatic proliferation induces not only quantitative changes in T cell cohorts, but qualitative changes as well, such as increased function and the development of a memory-cell phenotype. The mechanism of these changes has been shown to be primarily due to upregulation of a group of cytokines including IL-7 and IL-15 induced by lymphodepletion. Additionally, lymphodepletion is a non-selective method of eliminating several known regulatory, or immunosuppressive, subsets of immune cells, such as regulatory T cells.

== Clinical Trials Of T-Cell Adoptive Transfer ==
These observations have prompted several clinical studies of infusing pathogen- or tumor-specific T cells into lymphodepleted patients. A group at the National Cancer Institute demonstrated remarkable efficacy by infusing melanoma-specific T cells (obtained by growing tumor-infiltrating T cells ex vivo) into melanoma patients treated with lymphodepleting chemotherapy. In a series of studies (to 2005) of this approach, up to 70% of treated patients were shown to have regressions of their tumors, many of which had been considerable in size and refractory to other therapies. These findings compare favorably with standard-of-care therapies for melanoma which generally lead to tumor regressions in only ~10-12% of patients.

== Pre-Clinical Studies And Clinical Trials Of Vaccine-Primed T-Cell Adoptive Transfer (I.E. Immunotransplant) ==
Because of the logistic difficulty of obtaining tumor-specific T cells via the ex vivo expansion of tumor-infiltrating cells, a number of studies have examined inducing these cells in vivo by vaccination. Levitsky et al., at Johns Hopkins, in a series of pre-clinical studies demonstrated that vaccine-induced T cells could be considerably more effective when re-infused into lymphodepleted recipients. Subsequently, a clinical study in patients with multiple myeloma conducted by June et al., demonstrated that a standard vaccination against pneumonia could induce a T-cell-mediated response to the vaccine and that re-infusing these T cells after an extremely lymphodepletive therapy –autologous stem cell transplant – could significantly enhance that response.

To expand this immunotransplant concept to the amplification of anti-cancer immunity, researchers at Stanford University developed a pre-clinical lymphoma model using a in situ, CpG-base vaccine to induce anti-tumor immunity and demonstrated that this immunity was enhanced 10-40 fold by immunotransplant. The above studies by Levitsky et al., were an important precedent for this work. In fact the Hopkins published preliminary results of a clinical study testing the basic immunotransplant concept in acute myeloid leukemia demonstrating encouraging signals of enhanced anti-tumor immunity. To continue the clinical translation of this approach, in August 2009 the Stanford group initiated a phase I/II clinical trial for patients with newly diagnosed mantle cell lymphoma. That study uses a whole-cell, CpG-activated, autologous tumor vaccine to induce anti-tumor immunity followed by leukapheresis and re-infusion of the vaccine-primed cells immediately after standard autologous transplant. Initial results of this study were presented at the ASCO 2011 Annual Meeting showing successful data towards the primary endpoint: amplification of anti-tumor T-cell responses.

== See also ==
- Vaccine
- Immunology
- T-Cell
- CpG
