= Tirabrutinib =

Chemical compound

Clinical data
- Trade names: Velexbru
- Other names: GS-4059; ONO-4059
- ATC code: L01EL06 (WHO)

Legal status
- Legal status: JP: Rx-only

Identifiers
- IUPAC name: 6-amino-9-[(3R)-1-(but-2-ynoyl)pyrrolidin-3-yl]-7-(4-phenoxyphenyl)purin-8-one
- CAS Number: 1351636-18-4
- PubChem CID: 54755438
- DrugBank: DB15227
- ChemSpider: 58171734
- UNII: LXG44NDL2T
- KEGG: D12594
- ChEMBL: ChEMBL4071161
- PDB ligand: 7GB (PDBe, RCSB PDB)

Chemical and physical data
- Formula: C_{25}H_{22}N_{6}O_{3}
- Molar mass: 454.490 g·mol^{−1}
- 3D model (JSmol): Interactive image
- SMILES: CC#CC(=O)N1CC[C@@H](n2c(=O)n(-c3ccc(Oc4ccccc4)cc3)c3c(N)ncnc32)C1
- InChI: InChI=1S/C25H22N6O3/c1-2-6-21(32)29-14-13-18(15-29)31-24-22(23(26)27-16-28-24)30(25(31)33)17-9-11-20(12-10-17)34-19-7-4-3-5-8-19/h3-5,7-12,16,18H,13-15H2,1H3,(H2,26,27,28)/t18-/m1/s1; Key:SEJLPXCPMNSRAM-GOSISDBHSA-N

Tirabrutinib (brand name Velexbru) is a drug used for the treatment of autoimmune disorders and hematological malignancies.

Tirabrutinib was approved in March 2020 in Japan for the treatment of recurrent or refractory primary central nervous system lymphoma. In addition, tirabrutinib is in clinical development by Ono Pharmaceutical and Gilead Sciences in the United States, Europe, and Japan for autoimmune disorders, chronic lymphocytic leukemia, B cell lymphoma, Sjogren's syndrome, pemphigus, and rheumatoid arthritis.

Tirabrutinib is an irreversible inhibitor of Bruton's tyrosine kinase.
