= Xiaodong Wang (biochemist) =

Chinese-American biochemist

- 王晓东
- Born: 1963 (age 62–63); Wuhan, Hubei; China
- Education: Beijing Normal University (BSc); University of Texas Southwestern Medical Center (PhD)
- Awards: Eli Lilly Award in Biological Chemistry; NAS Award in Molecular Biology; Shaw Prize in Life Science and Medicine; Richard Lounsbery Award; King Faisal International Prize in Medicine
- Scientific career
- Known for: Research of programmed cell death by apoptosis and necroptosis
- Fields: Biochemistry
- Institutions: Emory University; University of Texas Southwestern Medical Center; Howard Hughes Medical Institute; National Institute of Biological Sciences, Beijing; BeiGene
- Thesis: Studies on the process of mammalian precursor messenger RNA splice site selection (1991)
- Doctoral advisor: Richard A. Padgett
Xiaodong Wang
- Traditional Chinese: 王曉東
- Simplified Chinese: 王晓东
Transcriptions
Standard Mandarin
- Hanyu Pinyin: Wáng Xiǎodōng
- Wade–Giles: Wang^{2} Hsiao^{3}-tung^{1}

Xiaodong Wang (born 1963) is a Chinese-American biochemist best known for his work with apoptosis, which is the normal physiologic process of programmed cell death.

== Early life and education ==
Wang was born in Wuhan, China in 1963, and was raised in Xinxiang, Henan by his grandparents. His family was relatively well-educated. His grandfather was a high school English teacher, his grandmother a primary school teacher, and his great uncle a biology professor. His primary and secondary coincided with the Cultural Revolution, and he only started high school in 1978 at a top high school in Henan.

He entered the Beijing Normal University in 1980, majoring in biology, and completed 4 years later. His undergraduate thesis supervisor, Shaobai Xue, introduced him to cell biology and biochemistry, and prompted him to pursue postgraduate studies in biochemistry.

Through the government-sponsored Chinese-US Biochemistry Examination and Application (CUSBEA) program, the biochemistry counterpart to CUSPEA, Wang went to the University of Texas Southwestern Medical Center in 1985 for his PhD. The CUSBEA program was initiated by the biochemist Ray Wu at Cornell University and lasted from 1982 to 1989. He graduated in 1991.

== Career ==
After obtaining his PhD, Wang moved to the research group of Joseph L. Goldstein and Michael Stuart Brown, also at the University of Texas Southwestern Medical Center (UTSW) as a postdoctoral fellow. He joined the Department of Biochemistry of Emory University in 1995 as an assistant professor, then returned to UTSW a year later as an assistant professor at its Department of Biochemistry. He was promoted to associate professor in 1999. In 2001, Wang was appointed the George L. MacGregor Distinguished Chair in Biomedical Sciences.

Wang became an investigator at the Howard Hughes Medical Institute in 1997.

Since 2003, Wang has been an investigator at the National Institute of Biological Sciences, Beijing (NIBS). In 2010, he ended all his positions in the United States and returned to China to take up the role of director of NIBS.

Wang co-founded two biotechnology companies: Joyant Pharmaceuticals in 2004 and BeiGene, co-founded with John Oyler, in 2010. He currently chairs the Scientific Advisory Board of BeiGene.

Wang chaired the Science Committee of the Future Science Prize in 2017, and currently sits on the committee.

== Research ==
Wang's research on apoptosis began accidentally when he was a postdoctoral fellow at the research group of Joseph L. Goldstein and Michael Stuart Brown at the University of Texas Southwestern Medical Center. Apoptosis is a form of programmed cell death, which is the mechanisms that cells use kill themselves. Brown and Goldstein were at the time studying the transcriptional regulation of the low-density lipoprotein (LDL) receptor in response to cholesterol level. One of the regulatory mechanisms was through the activation of SREBP, a protein that regulates the manufacturing of mRNA from genes coding for proteins that import and synthesize cholesterol. SREBP bound to nuclear envelope and endoplasmic reticulum membranes, and had to be cleaved to be activated.

In 1995, Wang reported a protein in hamsters believed to be the one that cleaved SREBP. However, he also found that the human counterpart of this hamster protein was CPP32, which itself was related to one of the first proteins shown to be involved in initiating apoptosis. The CPP32 protein was officially renamed caspase 3 the following year.

Breakthrough came during Wang's one year at Emory University, when he developed a cell-free, in vitro system that replicated the activation of caspase 3 and the initiation of apoptosis. Using this system, his group characterized the proteins required for starting apoptosis, including cytochrome c, Bcl-2, APAF1, and pro-caspase-9.

In 1997, his group reported the activation steps of apoptosis: Bcl-2 regulates the release of cytochrome c from the mitochondria to the cytosol, then cytochrome c binds to APAF1 and forms a protein complex called the apoptosome. The apoptosome recruits and cleaves procaspase-9 to the active form caspase-9, which in turn cleaves procaspase-3 to the active caspase 3.

Apart from apoptosis, Wang also discovered the necroptosis pathway, which is the programmed form of necrosis and another way that a cell kills itself. He established the role of RIPK3 and the MLKL protein in necroptosis.

== Honors and awards ==
- Eli Lilly Award in Biological Chemistry (2000)
- Member of the National Academy of Sciences (2004)
- NAS Award in Molecular Biology (2004)
- Richard Lounsbery Award (2007)
- Shaw Prize in Life Science and Medicine (2006)
- ASBMB–Merck Award, American Society for Biochemistry and Molecular Biology (2012)
- Foreign Academician of the Chinese Academy of Sciences (2013)
- Associate Member of the European Molecular Biology Organization (2014)
- King Faisal International Prize in Medicine (2020)
- Asian Scientist 100, Asian Scientist, (2021)
