= Rilzabrutinib =

Medication

Clinical data
- Trade names: Wayrilz
- Other names: PRN-1008
- AHFS/Drugs.com: Monograph
- MedlinePlus: a625102
- License data: US DailyMed: Rilzabrutinib
- Routes of administration: By mouth
- Drug class: Antineoplastic
- ATC code: None

Legal status
- Legal status: US: ℞-only; EU: Rx-only

Identifiers
- IUPAC name: (E)-2-[(3R)-3-[4-amino-3-(2-fluoro-4-phenoxyphenyl)pyrazolo[3,4-d]pyrimidin-1-yl]piperidine-1-carbonyl]-4-methyl-4-[4-(oxetan-3-yl)piperazin-1-yl]pent-2-enenitrile
- CAS Number: 1575591-66-0
- PubChem CID: 73388818
- DrugBank: DB17709
- ChemSpider: 58893525
- UNII: NWN58M4F5T
- KEGG: D11873
- ChEMBL: ChEMBL3702854

Chemical and physical data
- Formula: C_{36}H_{40}FN_{9}O_{3}
- Molar mass: 665.774 g·mol^{−1}
- 3D model (JSmol): Interactive image
- SMILES: CC(C)(/C=C(\C#N)/C(=O)N1CCC[C@H](C1)N2C3=NC=NC(=C3C(=N2)C4=C(C=C(C=C4)OC5=CC=CC=C5)F)N)N6CCN(CC6)C7COC7
- InChI: InChI=1S/C36H40FN9O3/c1-36(2,45-15-13-43(14-16-45)26-21-48-22-26)18-24(19-38)35(47)44-12-6-7-25(20-44)46-34-31(33(39)40-23-41-34)32(42-46)29-11-10-28(17-30(29)37)49-27-8-4-3-5-9-27/h3-5,8-11,17-18,23,25-26H,6-7,12-16,20-22H2,1-2H3,(H2,39,40,41)/b24-18+/t25-/m1/s1; Key:LCFFREMLXLZNHE-GBOLQPHISA-N

Rilzabrutinib, sold under the brand name Wayrilz, is an anti-cancer medication used for the treatment of immune thrombocytopenia. Rilzabrutinib is a tyrosine kinase inhibitor. It is taken by mouth.

Rilzabrutinib may increase the risk of serious infections (including bacterial, viral, or fungal). The most common side effects include diarrhea, nausea, headache, abdominal pain, and COVID-19.

Rilzabrutinib was approved for medical use in the United States in August 2025. The US Food and Drug Administration considers it to be a first-in-class medication.

== Medical uses ==
Rilzabrutinib is indicated for the treatment of adults with persistent or chronic immune thrombocytopenia who have had an insufficient response to a previous treatment.

== History ==
The safety and efficacy of rilzabrutinib was evaluated in a 24-week, double-blind, parallel-group study looking at durable platelet response (i.e., an increased number of platelets from baseline lasting the majority of the last twelve weeks of the treatment period). In this study, 202 participants were randomly assigned to either the rilzabrutinib group (133) or placebo group (69). During the 24-week treatment period, 31 (23%) participants in the rilzabrutinib group and no participants in placebo group achieved a sufficient and durable platelet count response, as determined by the study.

== Society and culture ==
=== Legal status ===
Rilzabrutinib was approved for medical use in the United States in August 2025.

In October 2025, the Committee for Medicinal Products for Human Use of the European Medicines Agency adopted a positive opinion, recommending the granting of a marketing authorization for the medicinal product Wayrilz, intended for the treatment of immune thrombocytopenia in adults who are refractory to other treatments. The applicant for this medicinal product is Sanofi B.V. Rilzabrutinib was authorized for medical use in the European Union in December 2025.

=== Names ===
Rilzabrutinib is the international nonproprietary name.

Rilzabrutinib is sold under the brand name Wayrilz.

== Research ==
Rilzabrutinib is an oral, reversible covalent inhibitor of Bruton's tyrosine kinase, that may increase platelet counts in people with immune thrombocytopenia by means of dual mechanisms of action: decreased macrophage (Fcγ receptor)–mediated platelet destruction and reduced production of pathogenic autoantibodies.
