= T(11:14) =

Chromosomal translocation

Overview of some chromosomal translocations involved in different cancers, as well as implicated in some other conditions, e.g. schizophrenia, with chromosomes arranged in standard karyogram order. t(11;14) is seen in center. Abbreviations: ALL – Acute lymphoblastic leukemia AML – Acute myeloid leukemia CML – Chronic myelogenous leukemia DFSP – Dermatofibrosarcoma protuberans

t(11;14) is a chromosomal translocation which essentially always involves the immunoglobulin heavy locus, also known as IGH in the q32 region of chromosome 14, as well as cyclin D1 which is located in the q13 of chromosome 11 . Specifically, the translocation is at t(11;14)(q13;q32).

The translocation is mainly found in mantle cell lymphoma, but also in B-cell prolymphocytic leukemia, in plasma cell leukemia, in splenic lymphoma with villous lymphocytes, in chronic lymphocytic leukemia, in multiple myeloma, and in AL amyloidosis. All these diseases involve B-lineage lymphocytes.

== Prognosis ==
In multiple myeloma, t(11;14) is a neutral prognostic factor in general, but it may confer a worse prognosis for overall survival in African American people with multiple myeloma.
