= Evobrutinib =

Legal status
- Legal status: Investigational

Identifiers
- IUPAC name: 1-[4-[[[6-amino-5-(4-phenoxyphenyl)pyrimidin-4-yl]amino]methyl]piperidin-1-yl]prop-2-en-1-one
- CAS Number: 1415823-73-2
- PubChem CID: 71479709
- DrugBank: DB15170
- ChemSpider: 58827807
- UNII: ZA45457L1K
- KEGG: D12467
- ChEMBL: ChEMBL4072833

Chemical and physical data
- Formula: C_{25}H_{27}N_{5}O_{2}
- Molar mass: 429.524 g·mol^{−1}
- 3D model (JSmol): Interactive image
- SMILES: C=CC(=O)N1CCC(CC1)CNC2=NC=NC(=C2C3=CC=C(C=C3)OC4=CC=CC=C4)N
- InChI: InChI=InChI=1S/C25H27N5O2/c1-2-22(31)30-14-12-18(13-15-30)16-27-25-23(24(26)28-17-29-25)19-8-10-21(11-9-19)32-20-6-4-3-5-7-20/h2-11,17-18H,1,12-16H2,(H3,26,27,28,29); Key:QUIWHXQETADMGN-UHFFFAOYSA-N

Evobrutinib is an experimental drug being studied for the treatment of encephalomyelitis and multiple sclerosis. It is an inhibitor of Bruton's tyrosine kinase.
