= Tolebrutinib =

Chemical compound

Clinical data
- Trade names: Cenrifki
- Other names: PRN-2246; SAR-442168
- Routes of administration: By mouth
- Drug class: Bruton's tyrosine kinase inhibitor
- ATC code: L04AA62 (WHO)

Legal status
- Legal status: EU: Rx-only

Identifiers
- IUPAC name: 4-amino-3-(4-phenoxyphenyl)-1-[(3R)-1-prop-2-enoylpiperidin-3-yl]imidazo[4,5-c]pyridin-2-one
- CAS Number: 1971920-73-6
- PubChem CID: 124111565
- DrugBank: DB18715
- ChemSpider: 88298633
- UNII: 8CZ82ZYY9X
- KEGG: D12213
- ChEMBL: ChEMBL4650323

Chemical and physical data
- Formula: C_{26}H_{25}N_{5}O_{3}
- Molar mass: 455.518 g·mol^{−1}
- 3D model (JSmol): Interactive image
- SMILES: C=CC(=O)N1CCC[C@H](C1)N2C3=C(C(=NC=C3)N)N(C2=O)C4=CC=C(C=C4)OC5=CC=CC=C5
- InChI: InChI=1S/C26H25N5O3/c1-2-23(32)29-16-6-7-19(17-29)30-22-14-15-28-25(27)24(22)31(26(30)33)18-10-12-21(13-11-18)34-20-8-4-3-5-9-20/h2-5,8-15,19H,1,6-7,16-17H2,(H2,27,28)/t19-/m1/s1; Key:KOEUOFPEZFUWRF-LJQANCHMSA-N

Tolebrutinib, sold under the brand name Cenrifki, is a medication used for the treatment of multiple sclerosis. It is a Bruton's tyrosine kinase inhibitor. It is taken by mouth.

Tolebrutinib was authorized for medical use in the European Union in June 2026.

== Medical uses ==
Tolebrutinib is indicated for the treatment of adults with secondary progressive multiple sclerosis without relapses in the last two years.

== Society and culture ==
=== Legal status ===
In April 2026, the Committee for Medicinal Products for Human Use of the European Medicines Agency adopted a positive opinion, recommending the granting of a marketing authorization for the medicinal product Cenrifki, intended for the treatment of multiple sclerosis. The applicant for this medicinal product is Sanofi Winthrop Industrie. Tolebrutinib was authorized for medical use in the European Union in June 2026.

=== Names ===
Tolebrutinib is the international nonproprietary name.

Tolebrutinib is sold under the brand name Cenrifki.
