= Poseltinib =

Chemical compound

Clinical data
- Other names: HM-7122; LY 3337641

Identifiers
- IUPAC name: N-(3-((2-((4-(4-Methylpiperazin-1-yl)phenyl)amino)furo[3,2-d]pyrimidin-4-yl)oxy)phenyl)acrylamide
- CAS Number: 1353552-97-2
- PubChem CID: 56644522
- UNII: D01E4B1U35
- CompTox Dashboard (EPA): DTXSID501112972

Chemical and physical data
- Formula: C_{26}H_{26}N_{6}O_{3}
- Molar mass: 470.533 g·mol^{−1}
- 3D model (JSmol): Interactive image
- SMILES: C=CC(=O)Nc1cccc(Oc2nc(Nc3ccc(N4CCN(C)CC4)cc3)nc3ccoc23)c1
- InChI: InChI=1S/C26H26N6O3/c1-3-23(33)27-19-5-4-6-21(17-19)35-25-24-22(11-16-34-24)29-26(30-25)28-18-7-9-20(10-8-18)32-14-12-31(2)13-15-32/h3-11,16-17H,1,12-15H2,2H3,(H,27,33)(H,28,29,30); Key:LZMJNVRJMFMYQS-UHFFFAOYSA-N

Poseltinib (HM71224, LY3337641) is an experimental Bruton's tyrosine kinase inhibitor for the treatment of rheumatoid arthritis. It was developed by Hanmi Pharmaceutical and licensed to Eli Lilly.

Phase II clinical trials began in August 2016 in patients with rheumatoid arthritis. Additional phase II trials are planned for treatment of lupus, lupus nephritis, Sjögren's syndrome, and other immunological conditions.
