= Birelentinib =

Investigational drug

Birelentinib INN: birelentinib

Clinical data
- Other names: BTK-IN-30; DZD-8586; GTPL13735

Identifiers
- IUPAC name: [(2S,5S)-5-[4-amino-5-[4-(2,3-difluorophenoxy)phenyl]imidazo[5,1-f][1,2,4]triazin-7-yl]oxan-2-yl]methanol
- CAS Number: 2662512-15-2
- PubChem CID: 156565109
- ChemSpider: 129957181
- UNII: Z2F599L9GD
- KEGG: D13253

Chemical and physical data
- Formula: C_{23}H_{21}F_{2}N_{5}O_{3}
- Molar mass: 453.450 g·mol^{−1}
- 3D model (JSmol): Interactive image
- SMILES: C1C[C@H](OC[C@@H]1C2=NC(=C3N2N=CN=C3N)C4=CC=C(C=C4)OC5=C(C(=CC=C5)F)F)CO
- InChI: InChI=InChI=1S/C23H21F2N5O3/c24-17-2-1-3-18(19(17)25)33-15-7-4-13(5-8-15)20-21-22(26)27-12-28-30(21)23(29-20)14-6-9-16(10-31)32-11-14/h1-5,7-8,12,14,16,31H,6,9-11H2,(H2,26,27,28)/t14-,16+/m1/s1; Key:NQJKXHPWHYRGST-ZBFHGGJFSA-N

Birelentinib is an investigational new drug that is being developed by for the treatment of immune thrombocytopenia (ITP), and chronic lymphocytic leukemia. It is a dual Bruton's tyrosine kinase (BTK) and tyrosine-protein kinase Lyn inhibitor.
