= Tislelizumab =

Monoclonal antibody

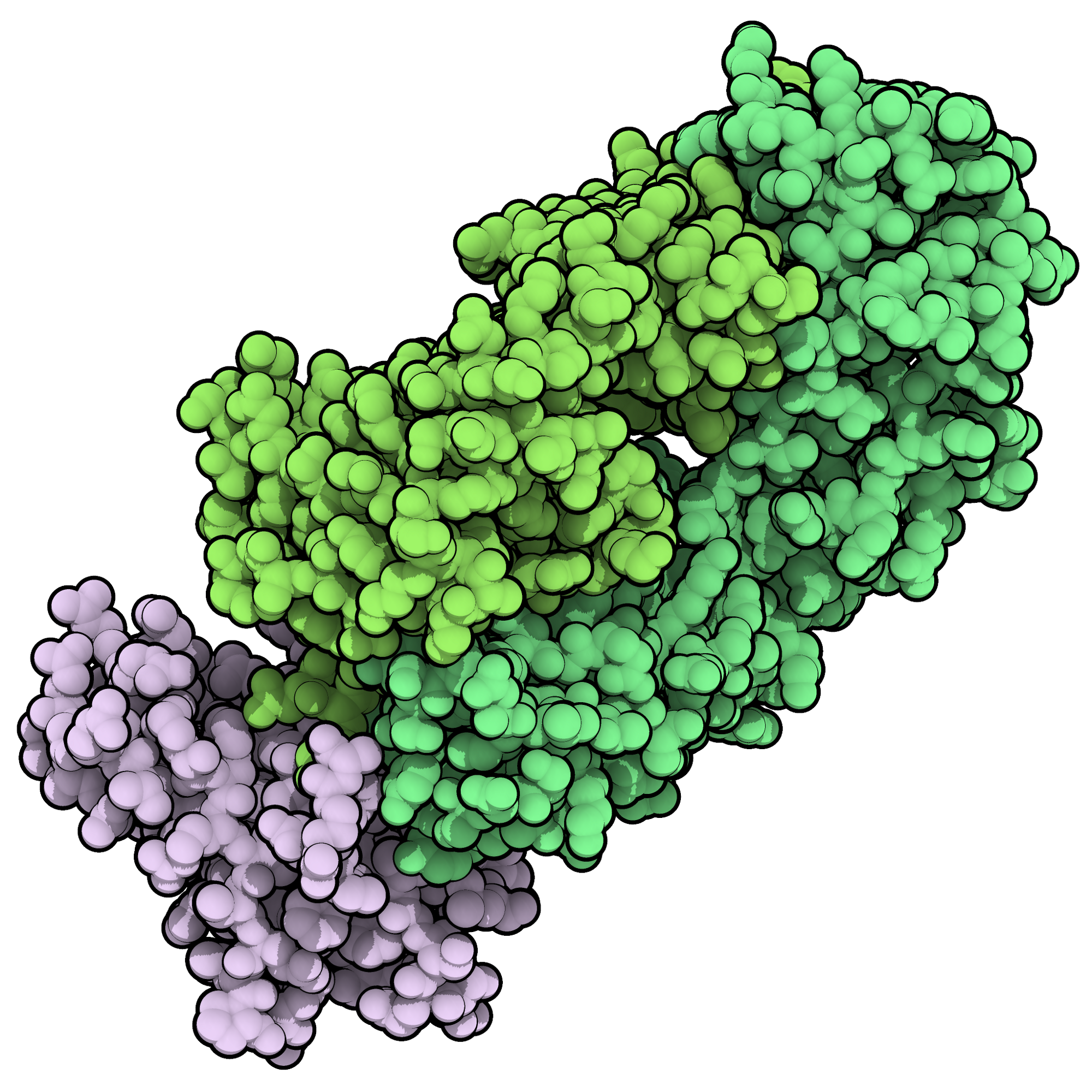
- Fab fragment of tislelizumab (green) binding the extracellular domain of PD-1 (pale pink). From PDB entry 7BXA

Monoclonal antibody
- Type: Whole antibody
- Source: Humanized
- Target: PD-1

Clinical data
- Trade names: Tevimbra
- Other names: BGB-A317, tislelizumab-jsgr
- AHFS/Drugs.com: Monograph
- MedlinePlus: a624026
- License data: US DailyMed: Tislelizumab
- Pregnancy category: AU: D
- Routes of administration: Intravenous
- Drug class: Antineoplastic agent
- ATC code: L01FF09 (WHO)

Legal status
- Legal status: AU: S4 (Prescription only); CA: ℞-only>; US: ℞-only; EU: Rx-only; In general: ℞ (Prescription only)

Identifiers
- CAS Number: 1858168-59-8
- DrugBank: DB14922
- ChemSpider: none
- UNII: 0KVO411B3N
- KEGG: D11487

Tislelizumab, sold under the brand name Tevimbra among others, is an anti-cancer medication used for the treatment of various forms of cancer. It is a humanized monoclonal antibody directed against programmed death receptor-1. It was developed by BeOne Medicines.

Tislelizumab was approved for medical use in China in December 2019, in the European Union in September 2023, in the United States in March 2024, and in Australia in May 2024.

== Medical uses ==
In China, tislelizumab is indicated to treat people with classical Hodgkin lymphoma who have received at least two prior therapies; and to treat people with locally advanced or metastatic urothelial carcinoma with PD-L1 high expression whose disease progressed during or following platinum-containing chemotherapy or within twelve months of neoadjuvant or adjuvant treatment with platinum-containing chemotherapy.

In the EU, tislelizumab is indicated for the treatment of adults with unresectable, locally advanced or metastatic esophageal squamous cell carcinoma after prior platinum-based chemotherapy. In November 2024, the European Commission expanded the indication of tislelizumab for use alongside platinum- and fluoropyrimidine-based chemotherapy to treat people with HER2-negative locally advanced unresectable or metastatic gastric or gastroesophageal junction adenocarcinoma; and, in combination with platinum-based chemotherapy, for those with unresectable, locally advanced or metastatic esophageal squamous cell carcinoma.

In the US, tislelizumab is indicated for the treatment of adults with unresectable or metastatic esophageal squamous cell carcinoma after prior systemic chemotherapy that did not include a PD-(L)1 inhibitor; and, in combination with platinum and fluoropyrimidine-based chemotherapy, it is indicated for the first-line treatment of adults with unresectable or metastatic HER2-negative gastric or gastroesophageal junction adenocarcinoma whose tumors express PD-L1.

== Adverse effects ==
Adverse effects include anemia, leukopenia, thrombocytopenia, nausea, increased aspartate transaminase (AST), neutropenia, fatigue, decreased appetite, vomiting, musculoskeletal pain, constipation, hypoproteinemia and rash. Fatal events such as respiratory infection or failure, and hepatic injury have been reported.

Adverse events are more common when combined with chemotherapy.

== Pharmacokinetics ==
Phase I clinical trial from 2016 has results suggesting an elimination half-life of 11 to 17 days. A 2021 structural and functional analysis suggests a t_{1/2} of 238 ± 32 minutes, 30- to 80-times higher than pembrolizumab and nivolumab.

== History ==
Phase I trials began in the United States and Australia in June 2015. Some early results were announced in July 2016.

A phase II clinical trial for urothelial cancer started in China in 2017.

Tislelizumab "demonstrated efficacy and tolerability" in a multicenter phase III trial for advanced hepatocellular carcinoma started in January 2018.

In November 2024, the European Medicines Agency expanded the indication of tislelizumab as part of a first-line combination treatment for adults with advanced gastric or esophageal cancer.

== Society and culture ==
=== Names ===
Tislelizumab is the international nonproprietary name.
