= Bruton's tyrosine kinase =

Kinase that plays a role in B cell development

BTK
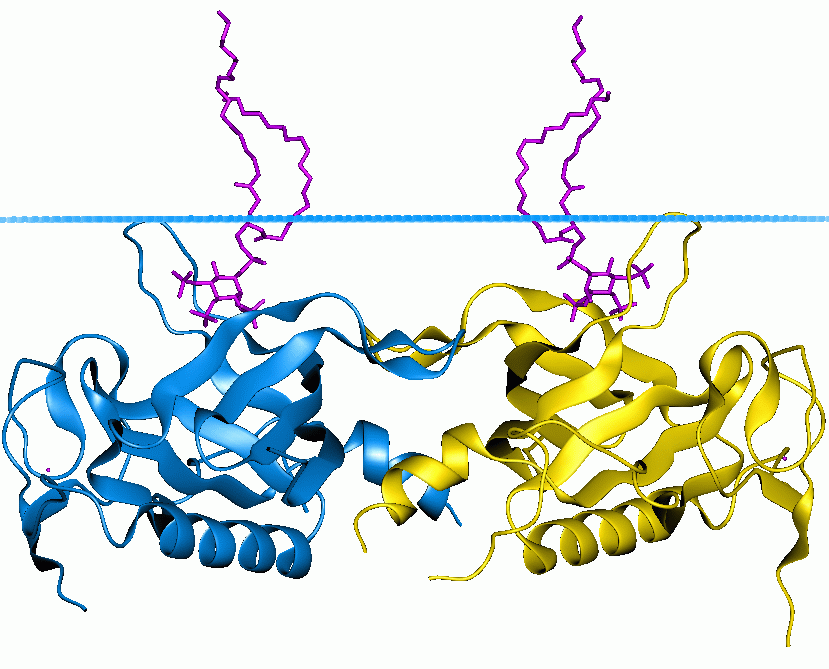

Identifiers
- Aliases: BTK, AGMX1, AT, ATK, BPK, IMD1, PSCTK1, XLA, Bruton tyrosine kinase, IGHD3
- External IDs: OMIM: 300300; MGI: 88216; GeneCards: BTK
Available structures
PDB	Ortholog search: PDBe RCSB
PDB	List of PDB id codes 1AWW, 1AWX, 1B55, 1BTK, 1BWN, 1K2P, 1QLY, 2GE9, 2Z0P, 3GEN, 3K54, 3OCS, 3OCT, 3P08, 3PIX, 3PIY, 3PIZ, 3PJ1, 3PJ2, 3PJ3, 4NWM, 4OT5, 4OT6, 4OTF, 4OTQ, 4OTR, 4RFY, 4RFZ, 4RG0, 4YHF, 4Z3V, 4ZLY, 4ZLZ, 5BPY, 5BQ0, 5FBN, 4RX5, 5FBO
Enzyme activity
EC #	BRENDA	ExPASy	KEGG	MetaCyc
2.7.10.2	↗	↗	↗	↗

Gene location (Human)
Chr.	X chromosome (human)
Band	Xq22.1	Start	101,349,338 bp
Band	Xq22.1	End	101,390,796 bp

Gene location (Mouse)
Chr.	X chromosome (mouse)
Band	X E3|X 56.18 cM	Start	133,443,085 bp
Band	X E3|X 56.18 cM	End	133,484,319 bp
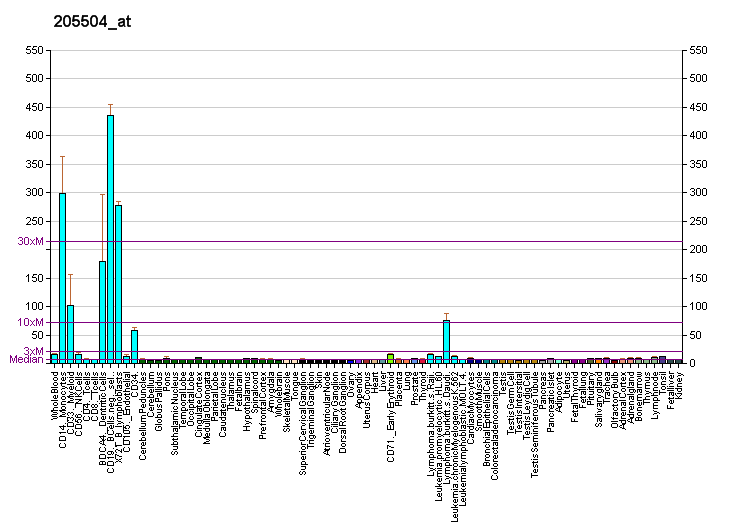
RNA expression pattern
Bgee	Human / Mouse (ortholog); Top expressed in: monocyte; granulocyte; spleen; bone marrow cell; lymph node; blood; appendix; epithelium of nasopharynx; right lung; upper lobe of left lung / Top expressed in: granulocyte; spleen; fetal liver hematopoietic progenitor cell; mesenteric lymph nodes; tibiofemoral joint; blood; bone marrow; secondary oocyte; zygote; stroma of bone marrow; More reference expression data
BioGPS	More reference expression data
Gene ontology
Molecular function	metal ion binding; nucleotide binding; lipid binding; signaling receptor binding; identical protein binding; protein kinase activity; transferase activity; kinase activity; phosphatidylinositol-3,4,5-trisphosphate binding; non-membrane spanning protein tyrosine kinase activity; ATP binding; protein binding; protein tyrosine kinase activity
Cellular component	cytoplasm; nucleus; membrane; membrane raft; extrinsic component of cytoplasmic side of plasma membrane; cytoplasmic vesicle; cytosol; plasma membrane; perinuclear region of cytoplasm; mast cell granule
Biological process	transmembrane receptor protein tyrosine kinase signaling pathway; mesoderm development; intracellular signal transduction; peptidyl-tyrosine autophosphorylation; B cell activation; positive regulation of NF-kappaB transcription factor activity; transcription, DNA-templated; positive regulation of B cell differentiation; B cell receptor signaling pathway; Fc-epsilon receptor signaling pathway; regulation of cell population proliferation; adaptive immune response; apoptotic process; peptidyl-tyrosine phosphorylation; protein phosphorylation; negative regulation of cytokine production; MyD88-dependent toll-like receptor signaling pathway; apoptotic signaling pathway; calcium-mediated signaling; I-kappaB kinase/NF-kappaB signaling; innate immune response; regulation of transcription, DNA-templated; cell maturation; immune system process; regulation of B cell cytokine production; regulation of B cell apoptotic process; phosphorylation; histamine secretion by mast cell; response to organic substance; positive regulation of type III hypersensitivity; protein autophosphorylation; cellular response to reactive oxygen species; cellular response to molecule of fungal origin; positive regulation of type I hypersensitivity; B cell affinity maturation; negative regulation of B cell proliferation; cellular response to interleukin-7; T cell receptor signaling pathway; G protein-coupled receptor signaling pathway
Sources:Amigo / QuickGO
Orthologs
Databases	NCBI: entry; OMA: entry
Species	Human	Mouse
Entrez	695	12229
Ensembl	ENSG00000010671	ENSMUSG00000031264
UniProt	Q06187	P35991
RefSeq (mRNA)	NM_001287345; NM_000061; NM_001287344	NM_013482
RefSeq (protein)	NP_000052; NP_001274273; NP_001274274	NP_038510
Location (UCSC)	Chr X: 101.35 – 101.39 Mb	Chr X: 133.44 – 133.48 Mb
PubMed search
- Wikidata
View/Edit Human	View/Edit Mouse

Bruton's tyrosine kinase (abbreviated Btk or BTK), also known as tyrosine-protein kinase BTK, is a tyrosine kinase that is encoded by the BTK gene in humans. BTK plays a crucial role in B cell development.

== Structure ==
BTK contains five different protein interaction domains. These domains include an amino terminal pleckstrin homology (PH) domain, a proline-rich TEC homology (TH) domain, SRC homology (SH) domains SH2 and SH3, as well as a protein kinase domain with tyrosine phosphorylation activity.

Part of the TH domain is folded against the PH domain while the rest is intrinsically disordered.

== Function ==
Involvement of BTK in B cell receptor signaling

BTK plays a crucial role in B cell development as it is required for transmitting signals from the pre-B cell receptor that forms after successful immunoglobulin heavy chain rearrangement. It also has a role in mast cell activation through the high-affinity IgE receptor.

BTK contains a PH domain that binds phosphatidylinositol (3,4,5)-trisphosphate (PIP3). PIP3 binding induces BTK to phosphorylate phospholipase C (PLC), which in turn hydrolyzes PIP_{2}, a phosphatidylinositol, into two second messengers, inositol triphosphate (IP3) and diacylglycerol (DAG), which then go on to modulate the activity of downstream proteins during B-cell signalling.

== Clinical significance ==
Mutations in the BTK gene are implicated in the primary immunodeficiency disease X-linked agammaglobulinemia (Bruton's agammaglobulinemia); sometimes abbreviated to XLA and selective IgM deficiency. Patients with XLA have normal pre-B cell populations in their bone marrow but these cells fail to mature and enter the circulation. The BTK gene is located on the X chromosome (Xq21.3-q22). At least 400 mutations of the BTK gene have been identified. Of these, at least 212 are considered to be disease-causing mutations.

BTK is important for the survival and proliferation of leukemic B cells, which motivated efforts to develop BTK inhibitors as treatments for B cell malignancies such as mantle cell lymphoma (MCL) and chronic lymphocytic leukemia (CLL). As BTK is also linked to autoimmune disorders, recent efforts have sought to evaluate BTK inhibition as a therapeutic strategy for treatment of diseases such as multiple sclerosis (MS) and rheumatoid arthritis (RA).

=== BTK inhibitors ===
Approved drugs that inhibit BTK:

- Acalabrutinib (Calquence), approved in October 2017 for relapsed mantle cell lymphoma and in October 2019 for Chronic lymphocytic leukemia (CLL) and Small lymphocytic lymphoma (SLL)
- Ibrutinib (Imbruvica), a selective Bruton's tyrosine kinase inhibitor.
- Orelabrutinib, approved in China for patients with mantle cell lymphoma (MCL) and chronic lymphocytic leukemia/small lymphocytic lymphoma (CLL/SLL), who have received at least one treatment in the past.
- Pirtobrutinib (Jaypirca), a reversible (non-covalent) inhibitor of BTK, for mantle cell lymphoma.
- Remibrutinib (Rhapsido), for chronic spontaneous urticaria
- Rilzabrutinib (Wayrilz) approved for immune thrombocytopenia
- Tirabrutinib (Velexbru), approved in March 2020, in Japan, for the treatment of recurrent or refractory primary central nervous system lymphoma.
- Zanubrutinib (Brukinsa) for mantle cell lymphoma, chronic lymphocytic leukemia (CLL), or small lymphocytic lymphoma (SLL). It can be taken by mouth.

Various drugs that inhibit BTK are in clinical trials:

- Phase 3:
  - Evobrutinib for multiple sclerosis.
  - Fenebrutinib (RG7845) for multiple sclerosis.
  - Tolebrutinib, for multiple sclerosis.
  - Birelentinib for immune thrombocytopenia (ITP), and chronic lymphocytic leukemia
  - Rocbrutinib for various types of lymphomas.
- Phase 2:
  - ABBV-105 for systemic lupus erythematosus (SLE)
  - Fenebrutinib (GDC-0853) for rheumatoid arthritis, systemic lupus erythematosus, multiple sclerosis and chronic spontaneous urticaria.
- Phase 1:
  - Elsubrutinib
  - Poseltinib, for autoimmune diseases, under development by Hanmi Pharmaceutical and Lilly as of 2015
  - Luxeptinib (CG-806), for CLL, SLL, non-Hodgkin lymphoma, acute myeloid leukaemia, and myelodysplastic syndromes (Phase I Trial; Phase I Trial). The inhibitor targets multiple kinase pathways, including BTK and FLT3.
  - Nemtabrutinib
  - Spebrutinib (AVL-292, CC-292)
  - Tirabrutinib, for non-Hodgkin lymphoma and/or CLL. Renamed GS-4059 and now in trial NCT02457598.
  - Vecabrutinib
  - Branebrutinib
  - Catadegbrutinib
  - Bexobrutideg / Bexodegbrutinib
  - Sunvozertinib
  - Avitinib

== Discovery ==
Bruton's tyrosine kinase is named for Ogden Bruton, who first described XLA in 1952. Later studies in 1993 and 1994 reported the discovery of BTK (initially termed B cell progenitor kinase or BPK) and found that BTK levels are reduced in B cells from XLA patients.

== Interactions ==
Bruton's tyrosine kinase has been shown to interact with:

- ARID3A
- BLNK (SLP-65),
- CAV1,
- GNAQ,
- GTF2I,
- PLCG2,
- PRKD1, and
- SH3BP5.
