= C12H22O6 =

The molecular formula C_{12}H_{22}O_{6} (molar mass: 262.3 g/mol) refers to a number of compounds, including:

- Dibutyl tartrate
- Etoglucid
