= Glenmark Pharmaceuticals =

Indian multinational pharmaceutical company

Glenmark Pharmaceuticals Limited
- Type: Public
- Traded as: BSE: 532296; NSE: GLENMARK
- Industry: Pharmaceuticals
- Founded: November 18, 1977; 48 years ago
- Founder: Gracias Saldanha
- Headquarters: Mumbai, India
- Key people: Glenn Saldanha (chairman & managing director)
- Products: Pharmaceutical drugs, active pharmaceutical ingredients
- Revenue: ▲₹16,983 crore (FY2026)
- Net income: ▲₹1,362 crore (FY2026)
- Number of employees: ~17,000 (March 2026)
- Website: glenmarkpharma.com

Glenmark Pharmaceuticals Limited is an Indian pharmaceutical company with its headquarters in Mumbai. It was founded 1977 by Gracias Saldanha as a generic drug and active pharmaceutical ingredient manufacturer, and its shares are listed on the Bombay Stock Exchange and the National Stock Exchange of India. The company produces and distributes medicines in more than 80 countries, with operations mainly in India, North America, and Europe. It had about 17,000 employees as of March 2026. Its name comes from Saldanha's sons, Glenn and Mark.

Glenmark began developing proprietary medicines in the mid-2010s. In 2025, its research arm, Ichnos Glenmark Innovation, licensed ISB 2001, an investigational treatment for multiple myeloma, to AbbVie for an upfront payment of $700 million. The U.S. Food and Drug Administration has issued warning letters to several of the company's plants in India and the United States.

== History ==
Glenmark was incorporated on 18 November 1977. It began producing generic drugs and active pharmaceutical ingredients for markets in India, Russia, and Africa, and went public on Indian stock exchanges in 1999. Gracias's son Glenn Saldanha became managing director in 2001 after working at Eli Lilly and Company and PricewaterhouseCoopers. The company expanded internationally under his leadership. By 2008, according to Geoff Hiscock, it was one of India's larger pharmaceutical manufacturers by sales volume. In 2011, consolidated worldwide sales reached $778 million. That year Glenmark established its first North American manufacturing facility in Monroe, North Carolina.

In the mid-2010s, Glenmark changed direction. The generic drug industry was seeing fewer patent expirations, and the company began developing proprietary medicines in oncology, dermatology, and respiratory treatments. It researched drugs internally and licensed them to larger pharmaceutical companies. By 2016, four Glenmark drugs were in clinical development. A respiratory treatment was licensed for commercialisation in North America and Japan, and a diabetes drug was licensed to Merck's German division. Sales that fiscal year were approximately ₹81 billion (about $1.25 billion), which Business Today described as fourth among India's pharmaceutical manufacturers by revenue.

Glenmark's consumer healthcare business in India included the antifungal Candid, launched in 1979, the respiratory medication Ascoril, and La Shield. It divested the intimate hygiene brand VWash to Hindustan Unilever in March 2020. In January 2024, Glenmark and its subsidiary Ichnos Sciences formed Ichnos Glenmark Innovation (IGI) to consolidate oncology drug discovery. Three molecules were in clinical development at launch, two with FDA orphan drug designations. Later in 2024, Glenmark sold a 75 percent stake in Glenmark Life Sciences to Nirma Limited for approximately ₹5,651 crore (about $680 million). In August 2025, it transferred its consumer healthcare products to a subsidiary, Glenmark Consumer Care Limited.

== Operations ==
Glenmark operates manufacturing facilities in India, the United States, Argentina, and the Czech Republic. Its oldest plant, in Maharashtra, opened in 1983. Other Indian sites are in Himachal Pradesh, Goa, Madhya Pradesh, and Sikkim. The company also runs a facility in Pilar, Argentina, focused on oncology injectables, and a plant in the Czech Republic acquired through the 2007 purchase of Medicamenta. U.S. corporate offices are in Elmwood Park, New Jersey. The plant in Monroe, North Carolina, opened in 2018, is Glenmark's only U.S. manufacturing site.

== Products ==
=== Respiratory ===
Glenmark's proprietary respiratory drug RYALTRIS, a nasal spray combining an antihistamine and a corticosteroid, received U.S. FDA approval for seasonal allergic rhinitis in adults and adolescents aged 12 and above. The company launched it in the United States in 2022, and in July 2026 the FDA expanded approval to children aged 6 to under 12. The company reported that by mid-2026 it had submitted marketing applications for the drug in more than 90 countries and was selling it in about 57 markets. With its partner Grand Pharmaceutical (China), Glenmark received approval for RYALTRIS in China in November 2025 and launched it there in March 2026; the drug was also approved in Thailand through a regional partner. In September 2026 Glenmark launched RYALTRIS in Brazil following approval by the Brazilian regulator ANVISA.

=== Oncology ===
Most of the company's oncology products are licensed. It distributes Tevimbra (tislelizumab) and Brukinsa (zanubrutinib) from BeiGene, and launched Brukinsa in India in 2025. It also markets envafolimab as QiNHAYO in India and selected emerging markets under a license from Jiangsu Alphamab and 3D Medicines. In September 2025 Glenmark licensed trastuzumab rezetecan from Hengrui Pharma for selected markets in a deal valued at up to $1.1 billion. In December 2025, Glenmark Specialty S.A. in-licensed aumolertinib from Hansoh Pharma for multiple regions. Aumolertinib had previously received approvals from the Medicines and Healthcare products Regulatory Agency and China's National Medical Products Administration for lung cancer treatment.

=== Dermatology ===
Winlevi (clascoterone cream) received European Commission marketing authorisation for the treatment of acne in adults and adolescents in November 2025, following a positive opinion from the European Medicines Agency in August 2025. Developed with Cosmo Pharmaceuticals, it was cleared for launch in 15 European countries, and Glenmark described it as its first new chemical entity launch in Europe. Glenmark began selling it in European markets in 2026.

=== Diabetes and cardiovascular ===
In January 2024 Glenmark launched Lirafit, a liraglutide biosimilar for diabetes, followed in March 2026 by Glipiq, a semaglutide biosimilar. It was one of several Indian drugmakers that launched generic semaglutide that month, after Novo Nordisk's patent expired.

Glenmark expanded its cardiovascular brand Telma (telmisartan), launched in 2003 for hypertension, to 16 related formulations. By 2024 the brand generated annual revenue of ₹1,036 crore.

=== Generics ===
The company reported that, as of June 2026, its U.S. product range comprised 225 authorised generic products, that 53 abbreviated new drug applications were pending before the FDA, and that it marketed 20 injectable products supplied through partners. Glenmark launched several generic and specialty products in the United States in 2025 and 2026, including injectables and, in 2026, a generic fluticasone propionate inhaler that received Competitive Generic Therapy designation and was eligible for 180 days of marketing exclusivity.

== Research and development ==
Glenmark's drug discovery work is carried out by Ichnos Glenmark Innovation (IGI), a clinical-stage biotechnology company set up jointly by Glenmark and Ichnos Sciences. IGI develops antibodies using its BEAT (Bispecific Engagement by Antibodies based on the T-cell receptor) platform.

The company's lead oncology candidate, ISB 2001, is a trispecific antibody that targets BCMA, CD38, and CD3 for relapsed or refractory multiple myeloma. In June 2025, IGI reported results from the dose-escalation portion of the Phase 1 TRIgnite-1 study at the annual meeting of the American Society of Clinical Oncology. Among 35 heavily pre-treated patients, who had received a median of six prior lines of therapy, the overall response rate was 74 percent, and 79 percent at higher dose levels. No dose-limiting toxicities were reported, and the most common adverse event was cytokine release syndrome, mostly mild. ISB 2001 had received FDA orphan drug designation in 2023 and later a fast track designation.

In July 2025, IGI signed a licensing agreement with AbbVie for ISB 2001, then in Phase 1 trials. AbbVie obtained exclusive rights in North America, Europe, Japan, and Greater China, while Glenmark retained rights in India and other emerging markets. The deal included an upfront payment of $700 million, with potential milestones of up to $1.225 billion and tiered royalties on net sales.

A second candidate, ISB 2301, is a multispecific antibody for solid tumours such as breast and lung cancer that targets three tumour-associated antigens and engages both T cells and natural killer cells. In May 2026, IGI said it had completed pre-clinical development and that the antibody had shown a favourable safety profile in non-human primates; it planned to file an investigational new drug application in the United States by the end of 2026 and to begin clinical studies in 2027. Outside oncology, IGI's candidates include ISB 830, an OX40 antagonist in Phase 2 trials that is licensed to Astria Therapeutics, and ISB 880, an IL-1RAP antagonist in Phase 1 trials that is licensed to Almirall.

In September 2025, Glenmark began a multi-country Phase 3 trial, excluding China, of envafolimab, a subcutaneous PD-L1 inhibitor, in patients with resectable stage III non-small cell lung cancer. The company obtained approval from the Drugs Controller General of India to enrol patients in India, filed a clinical trial application in Russia, and prepared sites in Brazil and Mexico; a separate Phase 3 study of the drug in China had been run by 3D Medicines since December 2023.

== Regulatory and legal matters ==
In August 2021 Glenmark recalled all products made at its Monroe plant. The FDA identified 17 manufacturing deficiencies there and issued a warning letter in 2022. After corrective actions, a December 2025 inspection was classified as Voluntary Action Indicated, allowing manufacturing to resume.

Several Indian facilities have also drawn FDA citations. Good manufacturing practice violations brought a warning letter to the Himachal Pradesh plant in October 2019. The Goa facility was cited in November 2022 for inadequate procedures to verify product strength and purity. A July 2025 warning letter cited the Madhya Pradesh plant for deficiencies in cleaning and testing procedures. After a June 2026 inspection of the Goa plant, the FDA issued an Establishment Inspection Report in September 2026 that classified the site as Voluntary Action Indicated.

In the quarter to June 2025, Glenmark made a provision of $37.75 million to settle a U.S. antitrust and consumer-protection lawsuit brought by a direct-purchaser class, subject to court approval. In May 2026, its U.S. subsidiary settled antitrust litigation with U.S. state attorneys general for $29.6 million, payable over five years; the company denied wrongdoing and did not admit liability.

== Financials ==
Selected consolidated financial results are shown below, with figures in ₹ crore.

Period	Revenue	Net profit	Notes
FY2026 (year to March 2026)	16,983	1,362	Revenue up 27.5% and net profit up 30.1% year-on-year; EBITDA ₹4,572 crore at a 26.9% margin
Q1 FY2026 (to June 2025)	3,264	46.8	Net profit fell about 86% after a provision for a U.S. legal settlement
Q4 FY2026 (to March 2026)	3,770.5	301.4	Board recommended a 250% dividend
Q1 FY2027 (to June 2026)	4,018	483	Net profit up about 930% year-on-year
