= Elanco =

American livestock and pet healthcare company

Elanco Animal Health Incorporated

- Headquarters in Indianapolis, Indiana, in 2026
- Type: Public
- Traded as: NYSE: ELAN; S&P 400 component
- Industry: Pharmaceutical (animal)
- Founded: 1954
- Headquarters: Indianapolis, Indiana, U.S.
- Key people: Lawrence E. Kurzius (Chairman); Jeff Simmons (President and CEO)
- Products: Pharmaceutical drugs (animal)
- Revenue: ▲US$4.715 billion (2025)
- Operating income: ▲US$ 0.901 billion (2025)
- Net income: ▲US$ 0.473 billion (2025)
- Total assets: ▲US$13.358 billion (2025)
- Total equity: ▲US$10.85 billion (2026)
- Number of employees: 9,450 (2026)
- Website: elanco.com

Elanco Animal Health Incorporated is an American pharmaceutical company which produces medicines and vaccinations for pets and livestock. Until 2019, the company was a subsidiary of Eli Lilly and Company, before being divested. It is the third-largest animal health company in the world.

== History ==
The company traces its roots back to 1953 when Eli Lilly introduced their first antibiotic aimed at veterinary usage, with the new plant and animal sciences research being combined into Lilly's Agro-industrial division led by George Barnes. In the 1960s, the Agro-Industrial division was reorganised launching Elanco Products, short for the parent company name, Eli Lilly and Company.

In the 1980s, research moved away from plant sciences and focused on animal health and food quality. In the 1990s, another reorganisation led to the company being renamed Elanco Animal Health, focusing solely on animal health.

In 2007, the business acquired Ivy Animal Health and launched its companion animal business. In 2008, Elanco partnered with Heifer International. In 2009, the business launched its data analytics business, Elanco Knowledge Solutions.

In 2010, the business acquired the European rights to a portfolio of Pfizer Animal Health treatments and an Irish manufacturing site. In 2011, Elanco expanded its footprint in Europe, acquiring Janssen Animal Health. In 2012, the business acquired ChemGen Corp. In 2014, the business acquired Lohmann SE and Lohmann Animal Health for an undisclosed sum and Novartis Animal Health for $5.4 billion. In 2016, Elanco expanded its US-based business, acquiring vaccines from Boehringer Ingelheim Vetmedica for $885 million.

In 2013, Elanco made a $100M investment in China Animal Healthcare.

In 2018, Lilly announced plans to separate its Elanco Animal Health unit from the rest of the business via an initial public offering on the New York Stock Exchange, with the stock-ticker ELAN. In 2019, the divestiture was completed and Elanco launched on the New York Stock Exchange. In the same year, the US FDA approved rabacfosadine, a first-in-class treatment for canine lymphoma. The business continued to expand is US-business, acquiring Aratana Therapeutics, and its first-in-class treatment for canine osteoarthritis. Elanco also announced it would acquire the developer of vaccines for bacterial disease prevention in food-animals, Prevtec Microbia, Inc. In the same year, the business announced it would acquire Bayer's animal health business for $7.6 billion.

On December 3, 2020, Elanco announced plans to build a new global headquarters in Indianapolis at the site of the former GM stamping plant, which is located across the White River from the downtown area. The business plans to break ground on the new headquarters in the first half of 2021.

In August 2021, Elanco announced it had closed its acquisition of Kindred Biosciences.

Elanco's flea and tick collar, branded "Seresto", which was developed by Bayer Animal Health and acquired by Elanco in 2020, has been linked to more than 98,000 incidents of poisoning by pesticide, including more than 2,000 pet deaths, according to a 2022 report by a subcommittee of the House Committee on Oversight and Reform. The collars are not registered for sale in Canada.

In April 2022, Elanco officially broke ground on its new 40-acre global headquarters in Indianapolis. The campus, located at the former GM stamping plant site, is designed to serve as a central hub for the "Animal Health Clinic" innovation district.

On July 13, 2023, following a multi-year review, the EPA announced that they were unable to determine whether Seresto was the cause of reported animal deaths. The EPA limited the collar's registration to five years instead of the normal fifteen years registration, as other pesticides normally receive. Elanco and the EPA also agreed to develop a program designed to enhance data collection for adverse event reports and continued annual enhanced reporting of Seresto adverse event data.

In February 2024, Elanco announced a strategic shift to focus on its high-value pet health and livestock sustainability initiatives by selling its aquaculture business to Merck Animal Health for approximately $1.3 billion in cash. The divestiture, which included the company's aqua portfolio and related manufacturing sites, was completed later that year.

== Products ==
Elanco's portfolio includes several "blockbuster" products—brands that generate more than $100 million in annual revenue. These core products span both the pet health and farm animal segments.Key blockbuster brands include:

- Seresto: A long-acting flea and tick collar for dogs and cats, acquired through the Bayer Animal Health merger.
- Credelio (lotilaner): An oral parasiticide for dogs and cats that provides protection against ticks and fleas.
- Interceptor Plus: A monthly chewable tablet that prevents heartworm disease and treats common intestinal parasites.
- Galliprant: A first-in-class piprant for the treatment of pain and inflammation associated with osteoarthritis in dogs.
- Rumensin: A cattle feed ingredient that improves feed efficiency and prevents coccidiosis.

In 2024, Elanco launched what it termed its "next generation" of potential blockbusters, including Zenrelia, a once-daily oral tablet for canine dermatology, and Credelio Quattro, a broad-spectrum parasiticide designed to protect against ticks, fleas, heartworm, and tapeworms. The company also received FDA approval for Bovaer, a methane-reducing feed ingredient for dairy cattle, which is positioned as a cornerstone of its livestock sustainability portfolio.

== Acquisitions ==
Elanco Acquisitions
- Elanco Products Company (Established 1954 as a division of Eli Lilly and Company)
  - DowElanco (Established 1989 as joint venture with Dow Chemical, Sold stake 1999 to Dow)
    - Ivy Animal Health (Acq 2007)
  - Pfizer Animal Health (Acq 2010)
  - Janssen Pharmaceutica Animal Health (Acq 2011)
  - ChemGen Corp (Acq 2012)
  - Lohmann SE (Acq 2014)
    - Lohmann Animal Health (Acq 2014)
  - Novartis Animal Health (Acq 2014)
  - Bayer Animal Health (Acq 2019)
  - Kindred Biosciences (Acq 2021)
  - AHV International(Acq 2026)

== Sustainability and social responsibility ==
Elanco operates under a corporate social responsibility framework known as "Healthy Purpose". The initiative outlines several 2030 goals, including a commitment to help farmers reduce their environmental footprint and improving food security for 100 million people in emerging markets. The company has pledged to achieve "Net Zero" operations by 2030.
