= ATC code L01 =

Pharmaceutical drug classification

ATC code L01 Antineoplastic agents is a therapeutic subgroup of the Anatomical Therapeutic Chemical Classification System, a system of alphanumeric codes developed by the World Health Organization (WHO) for the classification of drugs and other medical products. Subgroup L01 is part of the anatomical group L Antineoplastic and immunomodulating agents.

Codes for veterinary use (ATCvet codes) can be created by placing the letter Q in front of the human ATC code: for example, QL01. ATCvet codes without corresponding human ATC codes are cited with the leading Q in the following list.
National versions of the ATC classification may include additional codes not present in this list, which follows the WHO version.

== L01A Alkylating agents ==
=== L01AA Nitrogen mustard analogues ===
L01AA01 Cyclophosphamide
L01AA02 Chlorambucil
L01AA03 Melphalan
L01AA05 Chlormethine
L01AA06 Ifosfamide
L01AA07 Trofosfamide
L01AA08 Prednimustine
L01AA09 Bendamustine
L01AA10 Melphalan flufenamide

=== L01AB Alkyl sulfonates ===
L01AB01 Busulfan
L01AB02 Treosulfan
L01AB03 Mannosulfan

=== L01AC Ethylene imines ===
L01AC01 Thiotepa
L01AC02 Triaziquone
L01AC03 Carboquone

=== L01AD Nitrosoureas ===
L01AD01 Carmustine
L01AD02 Lomustine
L01AD03 Semustine
L01AD04 Streptozocin
L01AD05 Fotemustine
L01AD06 Nimustine
L01AD07 Ranimustine
L01AD08 Uramustine

=== L01AG Epoxides ===
L01AG01 Etoglucid

=== L01AX Other alkylating agents ===
L01AX01 Mitobronitol
L01AX02 Pipobroman
L01AX03 Temozolomide
L01AX04 Dacarbazine

== L01B Antimetabolites ==
=== L01BA Folic acid analogues ===
L01BA01 Methotrexate
L01BA03 Raltitrexed
L01BA04 Pemetrexed
L01BA05 Pralatrexate

=== L01BB Purine analogues ===
L01BB02 Mercaptopurine
L01BB03 Tioguanine
L01BB04 Cladribine
L01BB05 Fludarabine
L01BB06 Clofarabine
L01BB07 Nelarabine
QL01BB90 Rabacfosadine

=== L01BC Pyrimidine analogues ===
L01BC01 Cytarabine
L01BC02 Fluorouracil
L01BC03 Tegafur
L01BC04 Carmofur
L01BC05 Gemcitabine
L01BC06 Capecitabine
L01BC07 Azacitidine
L01BC08 Decitabine
L01BC09 Floxuridine
L01BC52 Fluorouracil, combinations
L01BC53 Tegafur, combinations
L01BC58 Decitabine, combinations
L01BC59 Trifluridine, combinations

== L01C Plant alkaloids and other natural products ==
=== L01CA Vinca alkaloids and analogues ===
L01CA01 Vinblastine
L01CA02 Vincristine
L01CA03 Vindesine
L01CA04 Vinorelbine
L01CA05 Vinflunine
L01CA06 Vintafolide

=== L01CB Podophyllotoxin derivatives ===
L01CB01 Etoposide
L01CB02 Teniposide

=== L01CC Colchicine derivatives ===
L01CC01 Demecolcine

=== L01CD Taxanes ===
L01CD01 Paclitaxel
L01CD02 Docetaxel
L01CD03 Paclitaxel poliglumex
L01CD04 Cabazitaxel
L01CD51 Paclitaxel and encequidar

=== L01CE Topoisomerase 1 (TOP1) inhibitors ===
L01CE01 Topotecan
L01CE02 Irinotecan
L01CE03 Etirinotecan pegol
L01CE04 Belotecan

=== L01CX Other plant alkaloids and natural products ===
L01CX01 Trabectedin

== L01D Cytotoxic antibiotics and related substances ==
=== L01DA Actinomycines ===
L01DA01 Dactinomycin

=== L01DB Anthracyclines and related substances ===
L01DB01 Doxorubicin
L01DB02 Daunorubicin
L01DB03 Epirubicin
L01DB04 Aclarubicin
L01DB05 Zorubicin
L01DB06 Idarubicin
L01DB07 Mitoxantrone
L01DB08 Pirarubicin
L01DB09 Valrubicin
L01DB10 Amrubicin
L01DB11 Pixantrone

=== L01DC Other cytotoxic antibiotics ===
L01DC01 Bleomycin
L01DC02 Plicamycin
L01DC03 Mitomycin
L01DC04 Ixabepilone
L01DC05 Utidelone

== L01E Protein kinase inhibitors ==
=== L01EA BCR-ABL tyrosine kinase inhibitors ===
L01EA01 Imatinib
L01EA02 Dasatinib
L01EA03 Nilotinib
L01EA04 Bosutinib
L01EA05 Ponatinib
L01EA06 Asciminib

=== L01EB Epidermal growth factor receptor (EGFR) tyrosine kinase inhibitors ===
L01EB01 Gefitinib
L01EB02 Erlotinib
L01EB03 Afatinib
L01EB04 Osimertinib
L01EB05 Rociletinib
L01EB06 Olmutinib
L01EB07 Dacomitinib
L01EB08 Icotinib
L01EB09 Lazertinib
L01EB10 Mobocertinib
L01EB11 Aumolertinib
L01EB12 Firmonertinib

=== L01EC B-Raf serine-threonine kinase (BRAF) inhibitors ===
L01EC01 Vemurafenib
L01EC02 Dabrafenib
L01EC03 Encorafenib
L01EC04 Tovorafenib

=== L01ED Anaplastic lymphoma kinase (ALK) inhibitors ===
L01ED01 Crizotinib
L01ED02 Ceritinib
L01ED03 Alectinib
L01ED04 Brigatinib
L01ED05 Lorlatinib

=== L01EE Mitogen-activated protein kinase (MEK) inhibitors ===
L01EE01 Trametinib
L01EE02 Cobimetinib
L01EE03 Binimetinib
L01EE04 Selumetinib
L01EE05 Mirdametinib
L01EE06 Tunlametinib

=== L01EF Cyclin-dependent kinase (CDK) inhibitors ===
L01EF01 Palbociclib
L01EF02 Ribociclib
L01EF03 Abemaciclib

=== L01EG Mammalian target of rapamycin (mTOR) kinase inhibitors ===
L01EG01 Temsirolimus
L01EG02 Everolimus
L01EG03 Ridaforolimus
L01EG04 Sirolimus

=== L01EH Human epidermal growth factor receptor 2 (HER2) tyrosine kinase inhibitors ===
L01EH01 Lapatinib
L01EH02 Neratinib
L01EH03 Tucatinib
L01EH04 Zongertinib
L01EH05 Mifanertinib
L01EH06 Sevabertinib

=== L01EJ Janus-associated kinase (JAK) inhibitors ===
L01EJ01 Ruxolitinib
L01EJ02 Fedratinib
L01EJ03 Pacritinib
L01EJ04 Momelotinib

=== L01EK Vascular endothelial growth factor receptor (VEGFR) tyrosine kinase inhibitors ===
L01EK01 Axitinib
L01EK02 Cediranib
L01EK03 Tivozanib
L01EK04 Fruquintinib
L01EK05 Rivoceranib

=== L01EL Bruton's tyrosine kinase (BTK) inhibitors ===
L01EL01 Ibrutinib
L01EL02 Acalabrutinib
L01EL03 Zanubrutinib
L01EL04 Orelabrutinib
L01EL05 Pirtobrutinib
L01EL06 Tirabrutinib

=== L01EM Phosphatidylinositol-3-kinase (Pi3K) inhibitors ===
L01EM01 Idelalisib
L01EM02 Copanlisib
L01EM03 Alpelisib
L01EM04 Duvelisib
L01EM05 Parsaclisib
L01EM06 Inavolisib

=== L01EN Fibroblast growth factor receptor (FGFR) tyrosine kinase inhibitors ===
L01EN01 Erdafitinib
L01EN02 Pemigatinib
L01EN03 Infigratinib
L01EN04 Futibatinib

=== L01EP Cellular-mesenchymal-epithelial transition factor (c-MET) kinase inhibitors ===
L01EP01 Capmatinib
L01EP02 Tepotinib
L01EP03 Savolitinib

=== L01EX Other protein kinase inhibitors ===
L01EX01 Sunitinib
L01EX02 Sorafenib
L01EX03 Pazopanib
L01EX04 Vandetanib
L01EX05 Regorafenib
L01EX06 Masitinib
L01EX07 Cabozantinib
L01EX08 Lenvatinib
L01EX09 Nintedanib
L01EX10 Midostaurin
L01EX11 Quizartinib
L01EX12 Larotrectinib
L01EX13 Gilteritinib
L01EX14 Entrectinib
L01EX15 Pexidartinib
L01EX18 Avapritinib
L01EX19 Ripretinib
L01EX22 Selpercatinib
L01EX23 Pralsetinib
L01EX24 Surufatinib
L01EX25 Umbralisib
L01EX26 Sitravatinib
L01EX27 Capivasertib
L01EX28 Repotrectinib
L01EX29 Vimseltinib
QL01EX90 Toceranib

== L01F Monoclonal antibodies and antibody drug conjugates ==
=== L01FA CD20 (clusters of differentiation 20) inhibitors ===
L01FA01 Rituximab
L01FA02 Ofatumumab
L01FA03 Obinutuzumab

=== L01FB CD22 (clusters of differentiation 22) inhibitors ===
L01FB01 Inotuzumab ozogamicin
L01FB02 Moxetumomab pasudotox

=== L01FC CD38 (clusters of differentiation 38) inhibitors ===
L01FC01 Daratumumab
L01FC02 Isatuximab

=== L01FD HER2 (human epidermal growth factor receptor 2) inhibitors ===
L01FD01 Trastuzumab
L01FD02 Pertuzumab
L01FD03 Trastuzumab emtansine
L01FD04 Trastuzumab deruxtecan
L01FD05 Trastuzumab duocarmazine
L01FD06 Margetuximab
L01FD07 Zanidatamab

=== L01FE EGFR (epidermal growth factor receptor) inhibitors ===
L01FE01 Cetuximab
L01FE02 Panitumumab
L01FE03 Necitumumab

=== L01FF PD-1/PDL-1 (programmed cell death protein 1/ death ligand 1) inhibitors ===
L01FF01 Nivolumab
L01FF02 Pembrolizumab
L01FF03 Durvalumab
L01FF04 Avelumab
L01FF05 Atezolizumab
L01FF06 Cemiplimab
L01FF07 Dostarlimab
L01FF08 Prolgolimab
L01FF09 Tislelizumab
L01FF10 Retifanlimab
L01FF11 Sugemalimab
L01FF12 Serplulimab
L01FF13 Toripalimab
L01FF14 Camrelizumab
L01FF15 Envafolimab
L01FF16 Sasanlimab

=== L01FG VEGF/VEGFR (vascular endothelial growth factor) inhibitors ===
L01FG01 Bevacizumab
L01FG02 Ramucirumab

=== L01FX Other monoclonal antibodies and antibody drug conjugates ===
L01FX01 Edrecolomab
L01FX02 Gemtuzumab ozogamicin
L01FX03 Catumaxomab
L01FX04 Ipilimumab
L01FX05 Brentuximab vedotin
L01FX06 Dinutuximab beta
L01FX07 Blinatumomab
L01FX08 Elotuzumab
L01FX09 Mogamulizumab
L01FX10 Olaratumab
L01FX11 Bermekimab
L01FX12 Tafasitamab
L01FX13 Enfortumab vedotin
L01FX14 Polatuzumab vedotin
L01FX15 Belantamab mafodotin
L01FX16 Oportuzumab monatox
L01FX17 Sacituzumab govitecan
L01FX18 Amivantamab
L01FX19 Sabatolimab
L01FX20 Tremelimumab
L01FX21 Naxitamab
L01FX22 Loncastuximab tesirine
L01FX23 Tisotumab vedotin
L01FX24 Teclistamab
L01FX25 Mosunetuzumab
L01FX26 Mirvetuximab soravtansine
L01FX27 Epcoritamab
L01FX28 Glofitamab
L01FX29 Talquetamab
L01FX31 Zolbetuximab
L01FX32 Elranatamab
L01FX33 Tarlatamab
L01FX34 Odronextamab
L01FX35 Datopotamab deruxtecan
L01FX36 Patritumab deruxtecan
L01FX37 Linvoseltamab
L01FX38 Ifinatamab deruxtecan
L01FX39 Bemarituzumab

=== L01FY Combinations of monoclonal antibodies and antibody drug conjugates ===
L01FY01 Pertuzumab and trastuzumab
L01FY02 Nivolumab and relatlimab
L01FY03 Prolgolimab and nurulimab

== L01X Other antineoplastic agents ==
=== L01XA Platinum compounds ===
L01XA01 Cisplatin
L01XA02 Carboplatin
L01XA03 Oxaliplatin
L01XA04 Satraplatin
L01XA05 Polyplatillen

=== L01XB Methylhydrazines ===
L01XB01 Procarbazine

=== L01XD Sensitizers used in photodynamic/radiation therapy ===
L01XD01 Porfimer sodium
L01XD03 Methyl aminolevulinate
L01XD04 Aminolevulinic acid
L01XD05 Temoporfin
L01XD06 Efaproxiral
L01XD07 Padeliporfin

=== L01XF Retinoids for cancer treatment ===
L01XF01 Tretinoin
L01XF02 Alitretinoin
L01XF03 Bexarotene

=== L01XG Proteasome inhibitors ===
L01XG01 Bortezomib
L01XG02 Carfilzomib
L01XG03 Ixazomib

=== L01XH Histone deacetylase (HDAC) inhibitors ===
L01XH01 Vorinostat
L01XH02 Romidepsin
L01XH03 Panobinostat
L01XH04 Belinostat
L01XH05 Entinostat
L01XH06 Tucidinostat
L01XH07 Resminostat

=== L01XJ Hedgehog pathway inhibitors ===
L01XJ01 Vismodegib
L01XJ02 Sonidegib
L01XJ03 Glasdegib

=== L01XK Poly (ADP-ribose) polymerase (PARP) inhibitors ===
L01XK01 Olaparib
L01XK02 Niraparib
L01XK03 Rucaparib
L01XK04 Talazoparib
L01XK05 Veliparib
L01XK06 Pamiparib
L01XK07 Senaparib
L01XK52 Niraparib and abiraterone

=== L01XL Antineoplastic cell and gene therapy ===
L01XL01 Sitimagene ceradenovec
L01XL02 Talimogene laherparepvec
L01XL03 Axicabtagene ciloleucel
L01XL04 Tisagenlecleucel
L01XL05 Ciltacabtagene autoleucel
L01XL06 Brexucabtagene autoleucel
L01XL07 Idecabtagene vicleucel
L01XL08 Lisocabtagene maraleucel
L01XL09 Tabelecleucel
L01XL10 Nadofaragene firadenovec
L01XL11 Lifileucel
L01XL12 Obecabtagene autoleucel

=== L01XM Isocitrate dehydrogenase (IDH) inhibitors ===
L01XM01 Enasidenib
L01XM02 Ivosidenib
L01XM03 Olutasidenib
L01XM04 Vorasidenib

=== L01XU Other antineoplastic agents (cont.) ===
Empty group

=== L01XX Other antineoplastic agents ===
L01XX01 Amsacrine
L01XX02 Asparaginase
L01XX03 Altretamine
L01XX05 Hydroxycarbamide
L01XX07 Lonidamine
L01XX08 Pentostatin
L01XX10 Masoprocol
L01XX11 Estramustine
L01XX16 Mitoguazone
L01XX18 Tiazofurine
L01XX23 Mitotane
L01XX24 Pegaspargase
L01XX27 Arsenic trioxide
L01XX29 Denileukin diftitox
L01XX33 Celecoxib
L01XX35 Anagrelide
L01XX36 Oblimersen
L01XX40 Omacetaxine mepesuccinate
L01XX41 Eribulin
L01XX44 Aflibercept
L01XX46 Olaparib
L01XX52 Venetoclax
L01XX53 Vosaroxin
L01XX57 Plitidepsin
L01XX58 Epacadostat
L01XX66 Selinexor
L01XX67 Tagraxofusp
L01XX69 Lurbinectedin
L01XX72 Tazemetostat
L01XX73 Sotorasib
L01XX74 Belzutifan
L01XX75 Tebentafusp
L01XX77 Adagrasib
L01XX78 Navitoclax
L01XX79 Eflornithine
L01XX80 Imetelstat
L01XX81 Nirogacestat
L01XX82 Darinaparsin
L01XX83 Para-toluenesulfonamide
L01XX84 Pelabresib
L01XX85 Idroxioleic acid
L01XX86 Calaspargase pegol
L01XX87 Revumenib
QL01XX91 Tigilanol tiglate
QL01XX92 Verdinexor

=== L01XY Combinations of antineoplastic agents ===
L01XY01 Cytarabine and daunorubicin
L01XY04 Bifikafusp alfa and onfekafusp alfa
