= Glenn Saldanha =

Indian businessman

Glenn Mario Saldanha
- Born: Mumbai, India
- Education: University of Mumbai; Leonard Stern School of Business, New York University
- Occupation: Businessman
- Title: Chairman and managing director, Glenmark Pharmaceuticals
- Father: Gracias Saldanha

Glenn Mario Saldanha (born 1969) is an Indian businessman. He is the chairman and managing director of Glenmark Pharmaceuticals, an Indian pharmaceutical company founded in 1977 by his father, Gracias Saldanha, as a maker of generic drugs. Saldanha has run the company since 2001.

During Saldanha's tenure, Glenmark moved from branded generics into drug discovery and licensed drug candidates to multinational pharmaceutical companies for late-stage development and commercialisation. In 2025, its research arm licensed a cancer candidate to AbbVie in a deal with a $700 million upfront payment. Saldanha became president of the Indian Pharmaceutical Alliance in 2017 and its vice president in 2025. In 2026, Saldanha and his family were ranked 66th on the 360 ONE Wealth Creators List, with a combined net worth put at ₹27,792 crore, about $2.97 billion.

== Early life and education ==
Saldanha was born in Mumbai. He holds a Bachelor of Pharmacy from the University of Mumbai and an MBA from the Leonard N. Stern School of Business at New York University.

== Career ==
=== Early career ===
Saldanha began his career in the United States at Eli Lilly and Company, where he was a brand manager on Prozac. He then moved to PricewaterhouseCoopers as a management consultant, advising pharmaceutical clients that included Rhône-Poulenc Rorer, Bristol-Myers Squibb and SmithKline Beecham. He returned to India in 1998 and joined Glenmark as a director, when its annual sales were around ₹70 crore and came almost entirely from the domestic market. He became managing director and chief executive officer in 2001.

=== Move into drug discovery ===
India amended its patent law in 2005 to recognise product patents rather than only process patents, which restricted the manufacture of near-copies of patented drugs. Saldanha has said this was his reason for investing in original drug discovery rather than building the company around generics. Glenmark set up a drug discovery division ahead of the law, focused on oncology, dermatology and respiratory disease. It then began out-licensing the molecules it developed, partnering with larger companies for late-stage development and commercialisation in developed markets while keeping rights to India and other emerging markets.

Glenmark signed the first such agreement in September 2004, licensing an asthma and COPD candidate, GRC 3886 (oglemilast), to Forest Laboratories for $35 million in upfront and milestone payments. A second licence for the same molecule went to Teijin Pharma of Japan in April 2005 for $53 million. Oglemilast failed in COPD trials in 2008 and was discontinued. A type 2 diabetes candidate, GRC 8200, was licensed to Merck, which later returned it, while an osteoarthritis and pain candidate, GRC 6211, went to Eli Lilly. In 2010, Glenmark licensed a chronic pain candidate, GRC 15300, to Sanofi for $25 million upfront. Saldanha has said Glenmark earned about $230 million in total from out-licensing by 2014.

Glenmark also built a branded specialty portfolio that it sold directly, mainly in dermatology and respiratory medicine, while out-licensing in other areas. Ryaltris, a fixed-dose combination nasal spray for allergic rhinitis, won US FDA approval and launched in the United States in 2022.

=== Specialty and oncology ===
In January 2024, Glenmark and its subsidiary Ichnos Sciences set up Ichnos Glenmark Innovation (IGI) to house the group's cancer research. IGI signed a global licensing deal with AbbVie in July 2025 for ISB 2001, a multiple myeloma candidate built on a Glenmark antibody platform called BEAT. The drug targets proteins on both myeloma cells and T cells. AbbVie paid $700 million upfront, with milestone payments of up to $1.225 billion to follow, and Glenmark kept the commercialisation rights for India and other emerging markets. Saldanha said Glenmark had funded IGI since 2019 at about $70 million a year. By his account, the company went through some 12 failed candidates before ISB 2001, and an earlier plan to spin IGI off in the United States to raise money had fallen through, leaving Glenmark to fund it itself.

In December 2025, Glenmark's wholly owned subsidiary Glenmark Specialty S.A. signed an exclusive licence, collaboration and distribution agreement with Jiangsu Hansoh Pharmaceutical Group for aumolertinib, an EGFR tyrosine kinase inhibitor for non-small-cell lung carcinoma. The licence covered the Middle East and Africa, Southeast and South Asia, Australia, New Zealand, Russia and the CIS, and selected Caribbean countries. Hansoh was to receive an upfront payment in the low double-digit millions of dollars, with milestone payments that could cross $1 billion in total and tiered royalties on net sales.

In 2017, Saldanha became president of the Indian Pharmaceutical Alliance, an industry body for Indian drug companies. The alliance made him its vice president in October 2025, when Zydus Lifesciences managing director Sharvil Patel replaced Samir Mehta as president. Writing in Business Standard in 2026, Saldanha argued for a risk-based regulatory system as Indian pharma shifted from scale to innovation.

== Recognition ==
Business Today named Saldanha among India's best CEOs in 2014. In 2015, he received the India Pharma Leader award, given by the Department of Pharmaceuticals under the Ministry of Chemicals and Fertilizers, Government of India. In 2017, he won the EY Entrepreneur of the Year award in the life sciences and healthcare category in India.

Saldanha was ranked 57th on the Forbes India Rich List in 2013 and 69th in 2017. In 2026, Saldanha and his family were ranked 66th on the 360 ONE Wealth Creators List, with a combined net worth put at ₹27,792 crore, about $2.97 billion.
