= Bifikafusp alfa/onfekafusp alfa =

Combination medication

Combination of
- Bifikafusp alfa: Protein
- Onfekafusp alfa: Protein

Clinical data
- ATC code: L01XY04 (WHO)

Bifikafusp alfa/onfekafusp alfa is an experimental cancer treatment intended for the treatment of melanoma. It contains bifikafusp alfa and onfekafusp alfa.

Bifikafusp alfa consists of interleukin-2 (IL-2), a naturally occurring protein that activates certain white blood cells that can recognize and attack cancer cells. Bifikafusp alfa is linked to L19, another protein which was expected to enable the medicine to target cancer cells and not healthy tissue. Onfekafusp alfa consists of tumor necrosis factor which disrupts the blood supply to the tumor, and is also linked to L19.

== Legal status ==
In June 2025, Philogen S.p.A. withdrew its application in the European Union for a marketing authorization of Nidlegy for the treatment of melanoma, a type of skin cancer.
