= C20H30N4O2 =

The molecular formula C_{20}H_{30}N_{4}O_{2} (molar mass : 358.48 g/mol, exact mass : 358.236875) may refer to:

- Pracinostat
- Pariceract
- ADB-HEXINACA
