= Experimental cancer treatment =

Mainstream medical research into cancer treatment

Experimental cancer treatments are mainstream medical therapies intended to treat cancer by improving on, supplementing or replacing conventional methods (surgery, chemotherapy, radiation, and immunotherapy). However, researchers are still trying to determine whether these treatments are safe and effective treatments. Experimental cancer treatments are normally available only to people who participate in formal research programs, which are called clinical trials. Occasionally, a seriously ill person may be able to access an experimental drug through an expanded access program. Some of the treatments have regulatory approval for treating other conditions. Health insurance and publicly funded health care programs normally refuse to pay for experimental cancer treatments.

The entries listed below vary between theoretical therapies to unproven controversial therapies. Many of these treatments are alleged to help against only specific forms of cancer. It is not a list of treatments widely available at hospitals.

== Studying cancer treatments ==
The twin goals of research are to determine whether the treatment actually works (called efficacy) and whether it is sufficiently safe. Regulatory processes attempt to balance the potential benefits with the potential harms, so that people given the treatment are more likely to benefit from it than to be harmed by it.

Medical research for cancer begins much like research for any disease. In organized studies of new treatments for cancer, the pre-clinical development of drugs, devices, and techniques begins in laboratories, either with isolated cells or in small animals, most commonly rats or mice. In other cases, the proposed treatment for cancer is already in use for some other medical condition, in which case more is known about its safety and potential efficacy.

Clinical trials are the study of treatments in humans. The first-in-human tests of a potential treatment are called Phase I studies. Early clinical trials typically enroll a very small number of patients, and the purpose is to identify major safety issues and the maximum tolerated dose, which is the highest dose that does not produce serious or fatal adverse effects. The dose given in these trials may be far too small to produce any useful effect. In most research, these early trials may involve healthy people, but cancer studies normally enroll only people with relatively severe forms of the disease in this stage of testing. On average, 95% of the participants in these early trials receive no benefit, but all are exposed to the risk of adverse effects. Most participants show signs of optimism bias (the irrational belief that they will beat the odds).

Later studies, called Phase II and Phase III studies, enroll more people, and the goal is to determine whether the treatment actually works. Phase III studies are frequently randomized controlled trials, with the experimental treatment being compared to the current best available treatment rather than to a placebo. In some cases, the Phase III trial provides the best available treatment to all participants, in addition to some of the patients receiving the experimental treatment.

== Bacterial treatments ==
Chemotherapeutic drugs have a hard time penetrating tumors to kill them at their core because these cells may lack a good blood supply. Researchers have been using anaerobic bacteria, such as Clostridium novyi, to consume the interior of oxygen-poor tumours. These should then die when they come in contact with the tumor's oxygenated sides, meaning they would be harmless to the rest of the body. A major problem has been that bacteria do not consume all parts of the malignant tissue. However, combining the therapy with chemotherapeutic treatments can help to solve this problem.

Another strategy is to use anaerobic bacteria that have been transformed with an enzyme that can convert a non-toxic prodrug into a toxic drug. With the proliferation of the bacteria in the necrotic and hypoxic areas of the tumor, the enzyme is expressed solely in the tumor. Thus, a systemically applied prodrug is metabolised to the toxic drug only in the tumor. This has been demonstrated to be effective with the nonpathogenic anaerobe Clostridium sporogenes.

== Drug therapies ==
=== HAMLET (human alpha-lactalbumin made lethal to tumor cells) ===
HAMLET (human alpha-lactalbumin made lethal to tumor cells) is a molecular complex derived from human breast milk that kills tumor cells by a process resembling programmed cell death (apoptosis). As of 2008, it had been tested in humans with skin papillomas and bladder cancer.

=== p53 activation therapy ===
Several drug therapies are being developed based on p53, the tumour suppressor gene that protects the cell in response to damage and stress. It is analogous to deciding what to do with a damaged car: p53 brings everything to a halt, and then decides whether to fix the cell or, if the cell is beyond repair, to destroy the cell. This protective function of p53 is disabled in most cancer cells, allowing them to multiply without check. Restoration of p53 activity in tumours (where possible) has been shown to inhibit tumour growth and can even shrink the tumour.

As p53 protein levels are usually kept low, one could block its degradation and allow large amounts of p53 to accumulate, thus stimulating p53 activity and its antitumour effects. Drugs that utilize this mechanism include nutlin and MI-219, which are both in phase I clinical trials. As of 2009, there are also other drugs that are still in the preclinical stage of testing, such as RITA and MITA.

=== BI811283 ===
BI811283 is a small molecule inhibitor of the aurora B kinase protein being developed by Boehringer Ingelheim for use as an anti-cancer agent. As of 2010, BI 811283 is currently in the early stages of clinical development and is undergoing first-in-human trials in patients with solid tumors and Acute Myeloid Leukaemia.

=== Itraconazole ===
Itraconazole, sometimes abbreviated ITZ, is an antifungal medication used to treat a number of fungal infections. Recent research works suggest itraconazole (ITZ) could also be used in the treatment of cancer by inhibiting the hedgehog pathway in a similar way to Sonidegib.

=== Selective androgen receptor modulators ===
The majority of breast cancers are androgen receptor (AR) positive and SARMs may help treat these cancers, although promising results have only been obtained with cancers that are both estrogen receptor (ER) positive and AR positive. Anabolic androgenic steroids (AAS) were historically used successfully to treat AR positive breast cancer, but were phased out after the development of anti-estrogen therapies, due to androgenic side effects and concerns about aromatization to estrogen. SARMs have some of the same therapeutic effects as AAS, but fewer side effects, and they cannot be aromatized. Although a trial on AR positive triple negative breast cancer was ended early due to lack of efficacy, ostarine showed benefits in some patients with ER+, AR+ metastatic breast cancer in a phase II study. In patients with more than 40 percent AR positivity as determined by immunohistochemistry, the clinical benefit rate (CBR) was 80 percent and the objective response rate (ORR) was 48 percent—which was considered promising given that the patients had advanced disease and had been heavily pretreated. In 2022, the FDA granted fast track designation to ostarine for AR+, ER+, HER2- metastatic breast cancer. SARMs have also shown antitumor effects in prostate cancer.

== Gene therapy ==
Introduction of tumor suppressor genes into rapidly dividing cells has been thought to slow down or arrest tumor growth. Adenoviruses are a commonly utilized vector for this purpose. Much research has focused on the use of adenoviruses that cannot reproduce, or reproduce only to a limited extent, within the patient to ensure safety via the avoidance of cytolytic destruction of noncancerous cells infected with the vector. However, new studies focus on adenoviruses that can be permitted to reproduce, and destroy cancerous cells in the process, since the adenoviruses' ability to infect normal cells is substantially impaired, potentially resulting in a far more effective treatment.

Another use of gene therapy is the introduction of enzymes into these cells that make them susceptible to particular chemotherapy agents; studies with introducing thymidine kinase in gliomas, making them susceptible to aciclovir, are in their experimental stage.

== Epigenetic options ==
Epigenetics is the study of heritable changes in gene activity that are not caused by changes in the DNA sequence, often a result of environmental or dietary damage to the histone receptors within the cell. Current research has shown that epigenetic pharmaceuticals could be a putative replacement or adjuvant therapy for currently accepted treatment methods such as radiation and chemotherapy, or could enhance the effects of these current treatments. It has been shown that the epigenetic control of the proto-onco regions and the tumor suppressor sequences by conformational changes in histones directly affects the formation and progression of cancer. Epigenetics also has the factor of reversibility, a characteristic that other cancer treatments do not offer.

Some investigators, like Randy Jirtle, PhD, of Duke University Medical Center, think epigenetics may ultimately turn out to have a greater role in disease than genetics.

== Telomerase deactivation therapy ==
Because most malignant cells rely on the activity of the protein telomerase for their immortality, it has been proposed that a drug that inactivates telomerase might be effective against a broad spectrum of malignancies. At the same time, most healthy tissues in the body express little if any telomerase, and would function normally in its absence. Currently, inositol hexaphosphate, which is available over-the-counter, is undergoing testing in cancer research due to its telomerase-inhibiting abilities.

A number of research groups have experimented with the use of telomerase inhibitors in animal models, and as of 2005 and 2006 phase I and II human clinical trials are underway. Geron Corporation is currently conducting two clinical trials involving telomerase inhibitors. One uses a vaccine (GRNVAC1) and the other uses a lipidated oligonucleotide (GRN163L).

== Radiation therapies ==
=== Photodynamic therapy ===
Photodynamic therapy (PDT) is generally a non-invasive treatment using a combination of light and a photosensitive drug, such as 5-ALA, Foscan, Metvix, padeliporfin (Tookad, WST09, WST11), Photofrin, or Visudyne. The drug is triggered by light of a specific wavelength.

=== Hyperthermiatic therapy ===
Localized and whole-body application of heat has been proposed as a technique for the treatment of malignant tumours. Intense heating will cause denaturation and coagulation of cellular proteins, rapidly killing cells within a tumour.

More prolonged moderate heating to temperatures just a few degrees above normal (39.5 °C) can cause more subtle changes. A mild heat treatment combined with other stresses can cause cell death by apoptosis. There are many biochemical consequences to the heat shock response within the cell, including slowed cell division and increased sensitivity to ionizing radiation therapy. The purpose of overheating the tumor cells is to create a lack of oxygen so that the heated cells become overacidified, which leads to a lack of nutrients in the tumor. This in turn disrupts the metabolism of the cells so that cell death (apoptosis) can set in. In certain cases chemotherapy or radiation that has previously not had any effect can be made effective. Hyperthermia alters the cell walls by means of so-called heat shock proteins. The cancer cells then react very much more effectively to the cytostatics and radiation. If hyperthermia is used conscientiously it has no serious side effects.

There are many techniques by which heat may be delivered. Some of the most common involve the use of focused ultrasound (FUS or HIFU), microwave heating, induction heating, magnetic hyperthermia, and direct application of heat through the use of heated saline pumped through catheters. Experiments with carbon nanotubes that selectively bind to cancer cells have been performed. Lasers are then used that pass harmlessly through the body, but heat the nanotubes, causing the death of the cancer cells. Similar results have also been achieved with other types of nanoparticles, including gold-coated nanoshells and nanorods that exhibit certain degrees of 'tunability' of the absorption properties of the nanoparticles to the wavelength of light for irradiation. The success of this approach to cancer treatment rests on the existence of an 'optical window' in which biological tissue (i.e., healthy cells) are completely transparent at the wavelength of the laser light, while nanoparticles are highly absorbing at the same wavelength. Such a 'window' exists in the so-called near-infrared region of the electromagnetic spectrum. In this way, the laser light can pass through the system without harming healthy tissue, and only diseased cells, where the nanoparticles reside, get hot and are killed.

Magnetic Hyperthermia makes use of magnetic nanoparticles, which can be injected into tumours and then generate heat when subjected to an alternating magnetic field.

One of the challenges in thermal therapy is delivering the appropriate amount of heat to the correct part of the patient's body. A great deal of current research focuses on precisely positioning heat delivery devices (catheters, microwave, and ultrasound applicators, etc.) using ultrasound or magnetic resonance imaging, as well as of developing new types of nanoparticles that make them particularly efficient absorbers while offering little or no concerns about toxicity to the circulation system. Clinicians also hope to use advanced imaging techniques to monitor heat treatments in real time—heat-induced changes in tissue are sometimes perceptible using these imaging instruments. In magnetic hyperthermia or magnetic fluid hyperthermia method, it will be easier to control temperature distribution by controlling the velocity of ferrofluid injection and size of magnetic nanoparticles.

=== Noninvasive cancer heat treatment ===
Heat treatment involves using radio waves to heat up tiny metals that are implanted in cancerous tissue. Gold nanoparticles or carbon nanotubes are the most likely candidate. Promising preclinical trials have been conducted, although clinical trials may not be held for another few years.

Another method that is entirely non-invasive referred to as Tumor Treating Fields has already reached clinical trial stage in many countries. The concept applies an electric field through a tumour region using electrodes external to the body. Successful trials have shown the process effectiveness to be greater than chemotherapy and there are no side-effects and only negligible time spent away from normal daily activities. This treatment is still in very early development stages for many types of cancer.

High-intensity focused ultrasound (HIFU) is still in investigatory phases in many places around the world. In China it has CFDA approval and over 180 treatment centres have been established in China, Hong Kong, and Korea. HIFU has been successfully used to treat cancer to destroy tumours of the bone, brain, breast, liver, pancreas, rectum, kidney, testes, and prostate. Several thousand patients have been treated with various types of tumours. HIFU has CE approval for palliative care for bone metastasis. Experimentally, palliative care has been provided for cases of advanced pancreatic cancer. High-energy therapeutic ultrasound could increase higher-density anti-cancer drug load and nanomedicines to target tumor sites by 20x fold higher than traditional target cancer therapy.

== Cold atmospheric plasma treatment ==
Cold atmospheric plasma or CAP for has been proposed for the treatment of solid tumors.

== Electromagnetic treatments ==
Tumor Treating Fields is a novel FDA-approved cancer treatment therapy that uses alternating electric field to disturb the rapid cell division exhibited by cancer cells.

== Complementary and alternative treatments ==
Complementary and alternative medicine (CAM) treatments are the diverse group of medical and healthcare systems, practices, and products that are not part of conventional medicine and have not been proven to be effective. Complementary medicine usually refers to methods and substances used along with conventional medicine, while alternative medicine refers to compounds used instead of conventional medicine. CAM use is common among people with cancer.

Most complementary and alternative medicines for cancer have not been rigorously studied or tested. Some alternative treatments that have been proven ineffective continue to be marketed and promoted.
