= C16H19N3O4S =

The molecular formula C_{16}H_{19}N_{3}O_{4}S (molar mass : 349.40 g/mol) may refer to:

- Ampicillin, a beta-lactam antibiotic
- Cefradine, a first generation cephalosporin antibiotic
- Resminostat
