= Tiazofurin =

Chemical compound

Clinical data
- Other names: 2-[(2R,3R,4S,5R)-3,4-Dihydroxy-5-(hydroxymethyl)oxolan-2-yl]-1,3-thiazole-4-carboxamide
- ATC code: L01XX18 (WHO)

Identifiers
- IUPAC name: (1R)-1-[4-(aminocarbonyl)-1,3-thiazol-2-yl]-1,4-anhydro-D-ribitol
- CAS Number: 60084-10-8
- PubChem CID: 457954
- ChemSpider: 403014
- UNII: ULJ82834RE
- ChEMBL: ChEMBL108358
- CompTox Dashboard (EPA): DTXSID00208827

Chemical and physical data
- Formula: C_{9}H_{12}N_{2}O_{5}S
- Molar mass: 260.26 g·mol^{−1}
- 3D model (JSmol): Interactive image
- SMILES: O=C(c1nc(sc1)[C@@H]2O[C@@H]([C@@H](O)[C@H]2O)CO)N
- InChI: InChI=1S/C9H12N2O5S/c10-8(15)3-2-17-9(11-3)7-6(14)5(13)4(1-12)16-7/h2,4-7,12-14H,1H2,(H2,10,15)/t4-,5-,6-,7-/m1/s1; Key:FVRDYQYEVDDKCR-DBRKOABJSA-N

Tiazofurin is a drug which acts as an inhibitor of the enzyme IMP dehydrogenase. Tiazofurin and its analogues were under investigation for potential use in the treatment of cancer, though side effects such as pleuropericarditis and a flu-like syndrome precluded further development. They also show antiviral effects and may be reevaluated as potential options in the treatment of newly emerging viral diseases.

== Synthesis ==
ChemDrug Synthesis:

The treatment of 1-O-Acetyl-2,3,5-tri-O-benzoyl-beta-D-ribofuranose [6974-32-9] (1) with trimethylsilyl cyanide gives 2,3,5-Tri-O-benzoyl-beta-D-ribofuranosyl cyanide [23316-67-8] (2). Treatment with hydrogen sulfide led to (2R,3R,4R,5R)-2-((Benzoyloxy)methyl)-5-carbamothioyltetrahydrofuran-3,4-diyl dibenzoate, PC10907289 (3). Cyclization with Ethyl bromopyruvate [70-23-5] (4) led to 2-(2,3,5-Tri-O-benzoyl-beta-D-ribofuranosyl)-4-thiazolecarboxylic Acid Ethyl Ester [60084-09-5] (5). Removal of the protecting groups with sodium methoxide afforded 2-beta-D-Ribofuranosyl-4-thiazolecarboxylic Acid Ethyl Ester [95936-53-1] (6). Amide-ester interchange by treatment with dry ammonia completed the synthesis of Tiazofurin (7).
