= Necitumumab =

Recombinant human monoclonal antibody

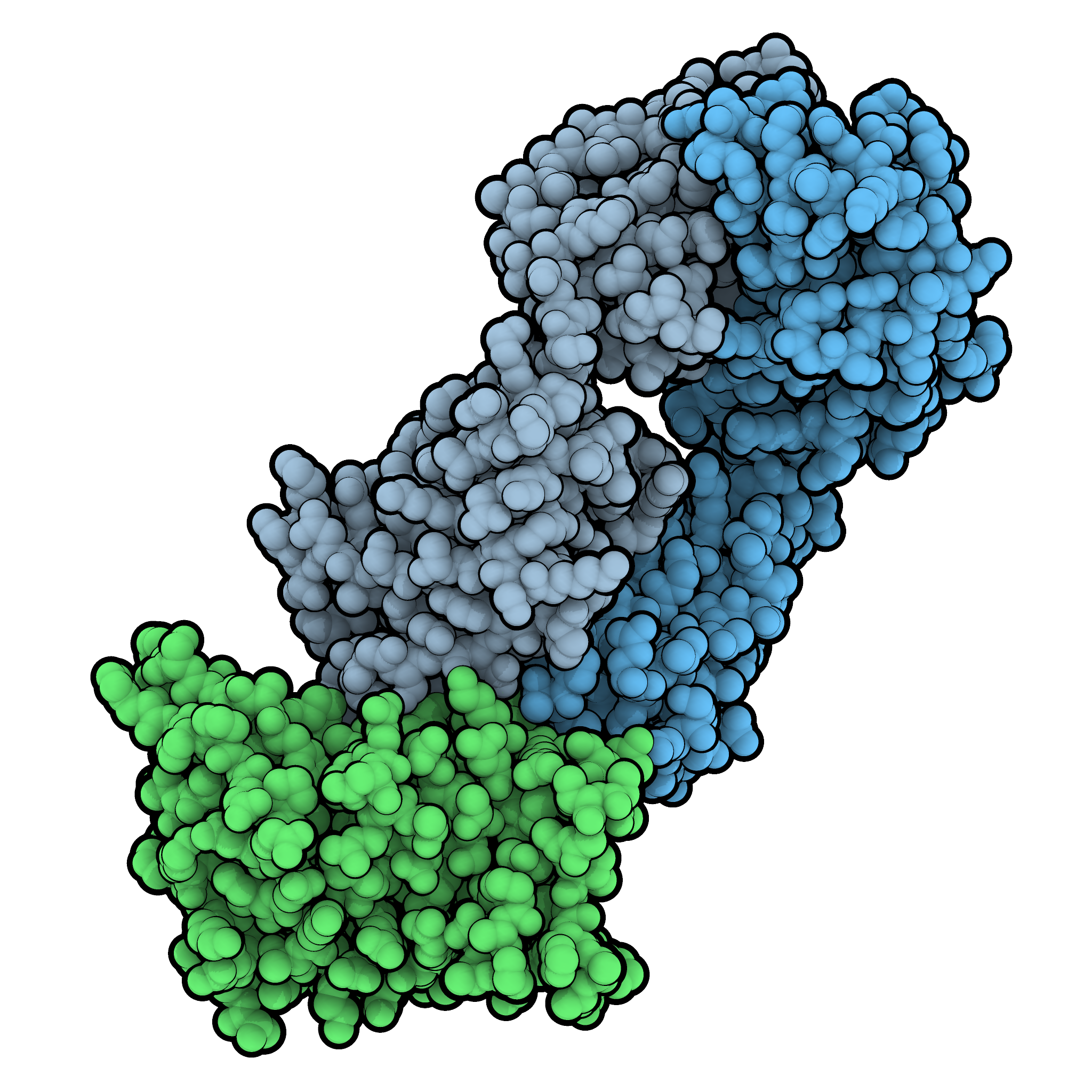
- Necitumumab Fab (blue) bound to EGFR (green). PDB: 6B3S

Monoclonal antibody
- Type: Whole antibody
- Source: Human
- Target: EGFR

Clinical data
- Trade names: Portrazza
- AHFS/Drugs.com: Multum Consumer Information
- License data: US DailyMed: Necitumumab
- Routes of administration: Intravenous infusion
- ATC code: L01FE03 (WHO)

Legal status
- Legal status: CA: ℞-only; US: WARNINGRx-only

Pharmacokinetic data
- Elimination half-life: ~14 days

Identifiers
- CAS Number: 906805-06-9
- DrugBank: DB09559
- ChemSpider: none
- UNII: 2BT4C47RUI
- KEGG: D10018

Chemical and physical data
- Formula: C_{6436}H_{9958}N_{1702}O_{2020}S_{42}
- Molar mass: 144844.87 g·mol^{−1}

Necitumumab (INN) is a recombinant human IgG1 monoclonal antibody used as an antineoplastic, which is manufactured by Eli Lilly. It binds to the epidermal growth factor receptor (EGFR). The US FDA approved necitumumab under the brand name Portrazza for use with gemcitabine and cisplatin in previously untreated metastatic squamous non-small-cell lung carcinoma (NSCLC). It was counterproductive in non-squamous non-small-cell lung carcinoma.
