= Pirarubicin =

Chemical compound

Clinical data
- Other names: (9S)-7-[(2R,4S,5S,6S)-4-amino-6-methyl-5-[(2R)-oxan-2-yl]oxyoxan-2-yl]oxy-6,9,11-trihydroxy-9-(2-hydroxyacetyl)-4-methoxy-8,10-dihydro-7H-tetracene-5,12-dione
- AHFS/Drugs.com: International Drug Names
- ATC code: L01DB08 (WHO)

Legal status
- Legal status: In general: ℞ (Prescription only)

Identifiers
- IUPAC name: (3S)-3-glycoloyl-3,5,12-trihydroxy-10-methoxy-6,11-dioxo-1,2,3,4,6,11-hexahydrotetracen-1-yl 3-amino-2,3,6-trideoxy-4-O-[(2R)-tetrahydro-2H-pyran-2-yl]-α-L-lyxo-hexopyranoside
- CAS Number: 72496-41-4
- PubChem CID: 3033521
- ChemSpider: 2298189
- UNII: D58G680W0G
- KEGG: D01885
- ChEBI: CHEBI:94770
- ChEMBL: ChEMBL1398373

Chemical and physical data
- Formula: C_{32}H_{37}NO_{12}
- Molar mass: 627.643 g·mol^{−1}
- 3D model (JSmol): Interactive image
- Melting point: 188 to 192 °C (370 to 378 °F) (decomposes)
- SMILES: C[C@H]1[C@H]([C@H](C[C@@H](O1)OC2C[C@@](CC3=C(C4=C(C(=C23)O)C(=O)C5=C(C4=O)C=CC=C5OC)O)(C(=O)CO)O)N)O[C@@H]6CCCCO6
- InChI: InChI=1S/C32H37NO12/c1-14-31(45-21-8-3-4-9-42-21)17(33)10-22(43-14)44-19-12-32(40,20(35)13-34)11-16-24(19)30(39)26-25(28(16)37)27(36)15-6-5-7-18(41-2)23(15)29(26)38/h5-7,14,17,19,21-22,31,34,37,39-40H,3-4,8-13,33H2,1-2H3/t14-,17-,19?,21+,22-,31+,32-/m0/s1; Key:KMSKQZKKOZQFFG-YHKVCKOMSA-N

Pirarubicin (INN) is an anthracycline drug. An analogue of the anthracycline antineoplastic antibiotic doxorubicin. Pirarubicin intercalates into DNA and interacts with topoisomerase II, thereby inhibiting DNA replication and repair and RNA and protein synthesis. This agent is less cardiotoxic than doxorubicin and exhibits activity against some doxorubicin-resistant cell lines.
