= Mannosulfan =

Chemical compound

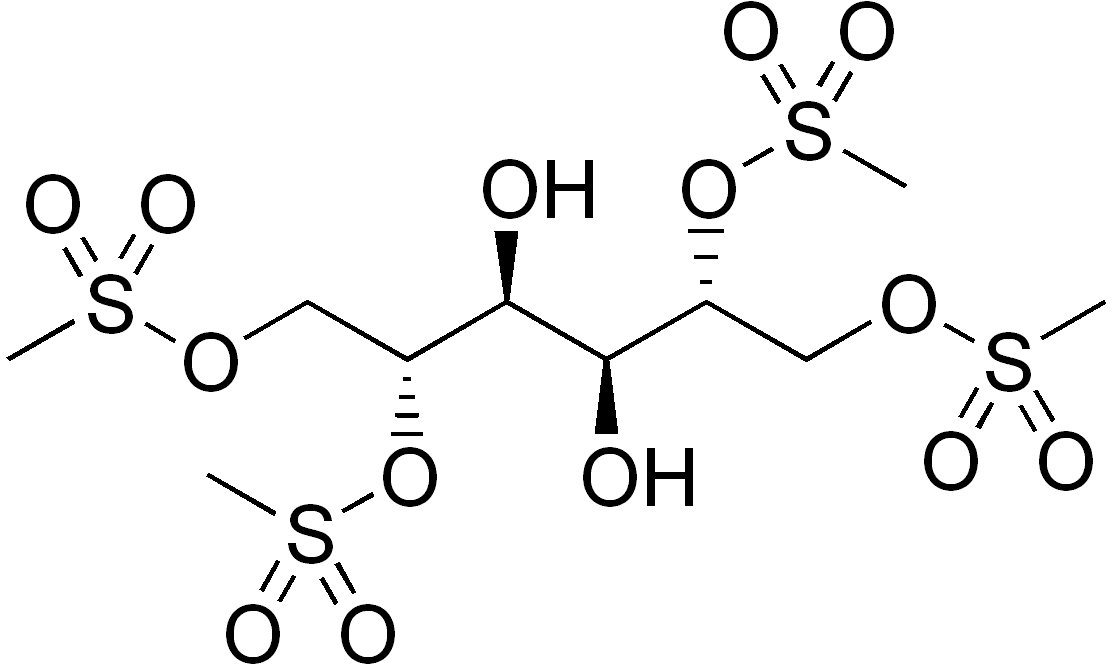

Clinical data
- Other names: [(2R,3S,4S,5R)-3,4-dihydroxy-2,5,6-tris(methylsulfonyloxy)hexyl] methanesulfonate
- ATC code: L01AB03 (WHO)

Identifiers
- IUPAC name: 1,2,5,6-Tetrakis-O-(methylsulfonyl)-D-mannitol
- CAS Number: 7518-35-6
- PubChem CID: 24140
- ChemSpider: 16736959
- UNII: 135FQ40L36

Chemical and physical data
- Formula: C_{10}H_{22}O_{14}S_{4}
- Molar mass: 494.51 g·mol^{−1}
- 3D model (JSmol): Interactive image
- SMILES: CS(=O)(=O)OC[C@H]([C@H]([C@@H]([C@@H](COS(=O)(=O)C)OS(=O)(=O)C)O)O)OS(=O)(=O)C
- InChI: InChI=1S/C10H22O14S4/c1-25(13,14)21-5-7(23-27(3,17)18)9(11)10(12)8(24-28(4,19)20)6-22-26(2,15)16/h7-12H,5-6H2,1-4H3/t7-,8-,9-,10-/m1/s1; Key:UUVIQYKKKBJYJT-ZYUZMQFOSA-N

Mannosulfan (INN) is an alkylating agent with the potential for the treatment of cancer. It is not approved by the United States FDA for cancer treatment. Research suggests it is less toxic than the alkyl sulfonate Busulfan.
