= Capivasertib =

Clinical data
- Pronunciation: /kæpˌaɪvəˈsɜːrtɪb/ kap-EYE-və-SER-tib
- Trade names: Truqap
- Other names: AZD-5363, AZD5363
- AHFS/Drugs.com
- MedlinePlus: a623056
- License data: US DailyMed: Capivasertib
- Pregnancy category: AU: D
- Routes of administration: By mouth
- Drug class: Threonine kinase inhibitor
- ATC code: L01EX27 (WHO)

Legal status
- Legal status: AU: S4 (Prescription only); CA: ℞-only; US: ℞-only; EU: Rx-only

Identifiers
- IUPAC name: 4-Amino-N-[(1S)-1-(4-chlorophenyl)-3-hydroxypropyl]-1-(7H-pyrrolo[2,3-d]pyrimidin-4-yl)piperidine-4-carboxamide
- CAS Number: 1143532-39-1
- PubChem CID: 25227436
- DrugBank: DB12218
- ChemSpider: 28189073
- UNII: WFR23M21IE
- KEGG: D11371
- ChEBI: CHEBI:229222
- ChEMBL: ChEMBL2325741
- PDB ligand: 0XZ (PDBe, RCSB PDB)
- CompTox Dashboard (EPA): DTXSID40150710
- ECHA InfoCard: 100.208.066

Chemical and physical data
- Formula: C_{21}H_{25}ClN_{6}O_{2}
- Molar mass: 428.92 g·mol^{−1}
- 3D model (JSmol): Interactive image
- SMILES: NC1(CCN(CC1)C1=C2C=CNC2=NC=N1)C(=O)N[C@@H](CCO)C1=CC=C(Cl)C=C1
- InChI: InChI=1S/C21H25ClN6O2/c22-15-3-1-14(2-4-15)17(6-12-29)27-20(30)21(23)7-10-28(11-8-21)19-16-5-9-24-18(16)25-13-26-19/h1-5,9,13,17,29H,6-8,10-12,23H2,(H,27,30)(H,24,25,26)/t17-/m0/s1; Key:JDUBGYFRJFOXQC-KRWDZBQOSA-N

Capivasertib, sold under the brand name Truqap, is an anti-cancer medication used for the treatment of breast cancer. It is taken by mouth.

The most common adverse reactions include diarrhea, cutaneous adverse reactions, increased random glucose, decreased lymphocytes, decreased hemoglobin, increased fasting glucose, nausea, fatigue, decreased leukocytes, increased triglycerides, decreased neutrophils, increased creatinine, vomiting, and stomatitis.

In November 2023, capivasertib was approved in the United States for people with hormone receptor-positive, human epidermal growth factor receptor 2-negative breast cancer when used in combination with fulvestrant. The US Food and Drug Administration (FDA) considers it to be a first-in-class medication. In April 2025 capivasertib, used alongside fulvestrant, was approved by the NHS in the UK.

== Medical uses ==
Capivasertib, used in combination with fulvestrant (Faslodex), is indicated for adults with hormone receptor-positive, human epidermal growth factor receptor 2-negative locally advanced or metastatic breast cancer with one or more PIK3CA/AKT1/PTEN-alterations, as detected by an FDA-approved test, following progression on at least one endocrine-based regimen in the metastatic setting or recurrence on or within twelve months of completing adjuvant therapy.

== History ==
Efficacy was evaluated in CAPItello-291 (NCT04305496), a randomized, double-blind, placebo-controlled, multicenter trial in 708 participants with locally advanced or metastatic HR-positive, HER2-negative breast cancer, of which 289 participants had tumors with PIK3CA/AKT1/PTEN-alterations. All participants were required to have progression on aromatase inhibitor-based treatment. Participants could have received up to two prior lines of endocrine therapy and up to one line of chemotherapy for locally advanced or metastatic disease.

== Society and culture ==
=== Legal status ===
Capivasertib was approved for medical use in the United States in November 2023. The FDA granted the application for capivasertib fast track designation.

In April 2024, the Committee for Medicinal Products for Human Use (CHMP) of the European Medicines Agency adopted a positive opinion, recommending the granting of a marketing authorization for the medicinal product Truqap, intended for the treatment of locally advanced or metastatic breast cancer with one or more PIK3CA/AKT1/PTEN alterations. The applicant for this medicinal product is AstraZeneca AB. Capivasertib was approved for medical use in the European Union in June 2024.
