= Plitidepsin =

Chemical compound

Names
- Systematic IUPAC name (2S)-N-[(1R)-1-({(3S,6R,7S,10R,11S,15S,17S,20S,25aS)-10-[(2S)-Butan-2-yl]-11-hydroxy-3-[(4-methoxyphenyl)methyl]-2,6,17-trimethyl-20-(2-methylpropyl)-1,4,8,13,16,18,21-heptaoxo-15-(propan-2-yl)docosahydro-15H-pyrrolo[2,1-d][10,19,1,4,7,14]dioxatetraazacyclotricosin-7-yl}carbamoyl)-3-methylbutyl]-N-methyl-1-(2-oxopropanoyl)pyrrolidine-2-carboxamide
- Other names Aplidine; Aplidin, dehydrodidemnin B; Aplidin; N-[1-(1,2-Dioxopropyl)-L-prolyl]didemnin A

Identifiers
CAS Number	137219-37-5
3D model (JSmol)	Interactive image
ChEBI	CHEBI:90205
ChEMBL	ChEMBL451930
ChemSpider	26001665
DrugBank	DB04977
KEGG	D11032
PubChem CID	9812534
UNII	Y76ID234HW
CompTox Dashboard (EPA)	DTXSID0040418
- InChI: InChI=1S/C59H91N7O14/c1-15-35(8)50-47(69)30-49(71)80-53(34(6)7)52(72)37(10)54(73)60-41(26-32(2)3)58(77)65-24-16-18-42(65)48(70)31-63(12)44(29-39-20-22-40(79-14)23-21-39)46(68)28-36(9)51(56(75)61-50)62-55(74)45(27-33(4)5)64(13)59(78)43-19-17-25-66(43)57(76)38(11)67/h20-23,32-37,41-45,47,50-51,53,69H,15-19,24-31H2,1-14H3,(H,60,73)(H,61,75)(H,62,74)/t35-,36-,37-,41-,42-,43-,44-,45+,47-,50+,51-,53-/m0/s1 Key: RZFJKZZAZSUBCF-VETSTYKFSA-N
- SMILES: O=C([C@@H](NC([C@@H](C)C([C@@H](OC(C[C@H](O)[C@H](NC([C@@H](NC([C@H](N(C([C@H]1N(C(C(C)=O)=O)CCC1)=O)C)CC(C)C)=O)[C@@H](C)OC([C@H](CC2=CC=C(OC)C=C2)N3C)=O)=O)[C@@H](C)CC)=O)C(C)C)=O)=O)CC(C)C)N4[C@H](C3=O)CCC4

Properties
Chemical formula	C_{57}H_{87}N_{7}O_{15}
Molar mass	1110.357 g·mol^{−1}

Pharmacology
ATC code	L01XX57 (WHO)
Pregnancy category	AU: D
Legal status	AU: S4 (Prescription only)
- Except where otherwise noted, data are given for materials in their standard state (at 25 °C [77 °F], 100 kPa). verify (what is ?) Infobox references

Plitidepsin, also known as dehydrodidemnin B and sold under the brand name Aplidin, is a chemical compound extracted from the ascidian Aplidium albicans.

== Medical uses ==
In Australia, plitidepsin, in combination with dexamethasone, is indicated for the treatment of people with relapsed and refractory multiple myeloma.

== Pharmacological activity ==
Plitidepsin exhibits antitumor, antiviral and immunosuppressive activities. It shows promise in shrinking tumors in pancreatic, stomach, bladder, and prostate cancers.

Plitidepsin inhibits the human protein eEF1A which has potential interactions with multiple coronavirus proteins. Plitidepsin possesses antiviral activity against SARS-CoV-2 in vitro and in an in vivo mouse model.

== Society and culture ==
=== Legal status ===
In July 2003, plitidepsin was granted orphan drug status by the European Medicines Agency (EMA) for treating acute lymphoblastic leukemia. In December 2017, the EMA's Committee for Medicinal Products for Human Use (CHMP) adopted a negative opinion, recommending the refusal of the marketing authorization for the treatment of multiple myeloma. After a re-examination of the opinion, the refusal of the marketing authorization was confirmed in March 2018. The CHMP is of the opinion that the benefits of Aplidin do not outweigh its risks. In October 2020, the General Court upheld PharmaMar's appeal and annulled the decision refusing marketing authorization for Aplidin, and the European Commission then returned the application for Aplidin to the EMA. In July 2025, PharmaMar withdrew its application for a marketing authorization of Aplidin for the treatment of multiple myeloma.

Plitidepsin was approved for medical used in Australia in December 2018.
