= Sugemalimab =

Medication

Monoclonal antibody
- Type: Whole antibody
- Source: Human
- Target: PD-L1, (CD274)

Clinical data
- Trade names: Cejemly, Eqjubi
- Other names: CS-1001, WBP-315
- Routes of administration: Intravenous
- Drug class: Antineoplastic
- ATC code: L01FF11 (WHO)

Legal status
- Legal status: UK: POM (Prescription only); EU: Rx-only; In general: ℞ (Prescription only)

Identifiers
- CAS Number: 2256084-03-2
- DrugBank: DB16641
- UNII: 90IQR2I6TR
- KEGG: D12750

Sugemalimab, sold under the brand name Cejemly among others, is a monoclonal antibody used for the treatment of metastatic non-small cell lung cancer (NSCLC) in combination with chemotherapy. It is an antineoplastic monoclonal antibody that potentiates T-cell responses, including anti-tumor responses, through blockade of PD-1 binding to PD-L1 ligands.

The most common side effects include anemia (low red blood cells), increased levels of aminotransferases (liver enzymes), rash, hyperlipidemia (high blood fat levels), hyperglycemia (high blood glucose levels), hyponatremia (low blood levels of sodium), hypokalemia (low blood levels of potassium), proteinuria (protein in urine), abdominal (belly) pain, tiredness, arthralgia (joint pain), hypoesthesia (reduced sensation to touch, pain and temperature), hypothyroidism (underactive thyroid gland) and hypocalcemia (low blood levels of calcium).

Sugemalimab was approved for medical use in China in December 2021, the European Union in July 2024, and the United Kingdom in October 2024.

== Medical uses ==
Sugemalimab, in combination with platinum-based chemotherapy, is indicated for the first-line treatment of adults with metastatic non-small cell lung cancer with no sensitising EGFR mutations, or ALK, ROS1 or RET genomic tumor aberrations.

== Mechanism of action ==
Sugemalimab is a fully human monoclonal antibody that targets the immunosuppressive ligand programmed cell death-1 ligand 1 (PD-L1; cluster of differentiation 274; CD274) and possesses immune checkpoint inhibitory and antineoplastic properties. When administered, sugemalimab binds specifically to PD-L1, blocking its interaction with its receptor, programmed cell death 1 (PD-1). This inhibition reverses T-cell inactivation induced by PD-1/PD-L1 signaling, enhancing the cytotoxic T-lymphocyte (CTL)-mediated immune response against tumor cells that express PD-L1. Many types of human cancer cells overexpress PD-L1, which, when bound to PD-1 on T-cells, suppresses the immune system and enables immune evasion. PD-1 itself is a transmembrane protein in the immunoglobulin superfamily expressed on activated T-cells, acting as a negative immune regulator that limits CD8-positive T-cell expansion and survival. The anti-PD-L1 monoclonal antibody CS1001, modeled after natural immunoglobulin G4 (IgG4), may reduce immunogenicity and other associated toxicities.

== Society and culture ==
=== Legal status ===
In May 2024, the Committee for Medicinal Products for Human Use of the European Medicines Agency adopted a positive opinion, recommending the granting of a marketing authorization for the medicinal product Cejemly, intended for the first-line treatment of metastatic non-small cell lung cancer in combination with chemotherapy. The applicant for this medicinal product is SFL Pharmaceuticals Deutschland GmbH. Sugemalimab was authorized for medical use in the European Union in July 2024.

In October 2024, the UK's Medicines and Healthcare products Regulatory Agency approved sugemalimab as part of a first-line combination treatment for lung cancer. The approval was granted to CStone Pharmaceuticalsn under brand name Eqjubi. Approval was based on the findings from the multicenter, randomized, double-blind phase III GEMSTONE-302 trial (NCT03789604).

=== Names ===
Sugemalimab is the international nonproprietary name.
