= Senaparib =

Chemical compound

Clinical data
- Trade names: Paishuning
- Other names: IMP-4297
- Routes of administration: By mouth
- Drug class: Antineoplastic
- ATC code: L01XK07 (WHO)

Legal status
- Legal status: EU: Rx-only; CN: Rx-only

Identifiers
- IUPAC name: 5-fluoro-1-[[4-fluoro-3-(4-pyrimidin-2-ylpiperazine-1-carbonyl)phenyl]methyl]quinazoline-2,4-dione
- CAS Number: 1401682-78-7
- PubChem CID: 68389008
- DrugBank: DB17163
- ChemSpider: 103704755
- UNII: MNZ4OP95CF
- KEGG: D13232
- ChEMBL: ChEMBL4802152

Chemical and physical data
- Formula: C_{24}H_{20}F_{2}N_{6}O_{3}
- Molar mass: 478.460 g·mol^{−1}
- 3D model (JSmol): Interactive image
- SMILES: C1CN(CCN1C2=NC=CC=N2)C(=O)C3=C(C=CC(=C3)CN4C5=C(C(=CC=C5)F)C(=O)NC4=O)F
- InChI: InChI=1S/C24H20F2N6O3/c25-17-6-5-15(14-32-19-4-1-3-18(26)20(19)21(33)29-24(32)35)13-16(17)22(34)30-9-11-31(12-10-30)23-27-7-2-8-28-23/h1-8,13H,9-12,14H2,(H,29,33,35); Key:VBTUJTGLLREMNW-UHFFFAOYSA-N

Senaparib, sold under the brand name Paishuning, is an anti-cancer medication used for the treatment of epithelial ovarian, fallopian tube, or primary peritoneal cancer. It is a PARP inhibitor.

In January 2025, senaparib was approved for use in China for treatment of advanced epithelial high-grade ovarian cancer, fallopian tube cancer, or primary peritoneal cancer.

== Medical uses ==
Senaparib is indicated as monotherapy for the maintenance treatment of adults with advanced (FIGO Stages III and IV) epithelial high-grade ovarian, fallopian tube, or primary peritoneal cancer who are in response (complete or partial) following completion of first-line platinum-based chemotherapy.

== Society and culture ==
=== Legal status ===
Senaparib was approved for medical use in China in January 2025.

In September 2026, the Committee for Medicinal Products for Human Use of the European Medicines Agency adopted a positive opinion, recommending the granting of a marketing authorization for the medicinal product Sepalna, intended for the maintenance treatment of advanced epithelial ovarian, fallopian tube, and primary peritoneal cancer. The applicant for this medicinal product is SFL Pharmaceuticals Deutschland. Senaparib was authorized for medical use in the European Union in November 2026.

=== Names ===
Senaparib is the international nonproprietary name.

Senaparib is sold under the brand name Paishuning.
