= Streptomyces bobili =

Scientific classification
- Domain: Bacteria
- Kingdom: Bacillati
- Phylum: Actinomycetota
- Class: Actinomycetes
- Order: Streptomycetales
- Family: Streptomycetaceae
- Genus: Streptomyces
- Species: S. bobili

Binomial name
- Streptomyces bobili Waksman and Henrici 1948

Type strain
- AS 4.1624, ATCC 23889, ATCC 3310, BCRC 13671, CBS 419.34, CBS 675.68, CCRC 13671, CGMCC 4.1624, DSM 40056, ETH 9308, ETH 9446, HAMBI 1059, IAM 2, IFO 13199, IFO 16166, IMET 41372, IMRU 3310, ISP 3310, ISP 5056, JCM 4012, JCM 4627, KCC S-0012, KCC S-0627, NBRC 13199, NBRC 16166, NRRL B-1338, NRRL B-2097, NRRL B-B-2097, NRRL-ISP 5056, PSA 22, RIA 1116, RIA 91, VKM Ac-1756, WC 3310

Synonyms
- "Actinomyces bobili" Waksman and Curtis 1916; Streptomyces bobiliae [sic] (Waksman and Curtis 1916) Waksman and Henrici 1948; Streptomyces galilaeus Ettlinger et al. 1958 (Approved Lists 1980)

Species of bacterium

Streptomyces bobili is a bacterium species from the genus of Streptomyces which has been isolated from garden soil. Streptomyces bobili produces aclacinomycin A, aclacinomycin B, aclacinomycin M, aclacinomycin S, aclacinomycin Y, cinerubin A, cinerubin B, sulfurmycin A, sulfurmycin B, sulfurmycin C, sulfurmycin D, sulfurmycin F, ferrimycin A1 and ferrimycin A2.

== See also ==
- List of Streptomyces species
