= Aclarubicin =

Chemical compound

Clinical data
- AHFS/Drugs.com: International Drug Names
- Routes of administration: IV
- ATC code: L01DB04 (WHO)

Legal status
- Legal status: In general: ℞ (Prescription only)

Identifiers
- IUPAC name: (1S,2S,4R)-Methyl 4-(((2S,5R,6R)-4-(dimethylamino)-5-(((1S,3R,4S)-3-hydroxy-5-methyl-4-(((2S,6R)-6-methyl-5-oxotetrahydro-2H-pyran-2-yl)oxy)cyclohexyl)oxy)-6-methyltetrahydro-2H-pyran-2-yl)oxy)-2-ethyl-2,5,7-trihydroxy-6,11-dioxo-1,2,3,4,6,11-hexahydrotetracene-1-carboxylate
- CAS Number: 57576-44-0
- PubChem CID: 42474
- ChemSpider: 1931
- UNII: 74KXF8I502
- KEGG: D02756
- ChEBI: CHEBI:74619
- ChEMBL: ChEMBL502620
- CompTox Dashboard (EPA): DTXSID1022554
- ECHA InfoCard: 100.055.277

Chemical and physical data
- Formula: C_{42}H_{53}NO_{15}
- Molar mass: 811.878 g·mol^{−1}
- 3D model (JSmol): Interactive image
- Melting point: 151 to 153 °C (304 to 307 °F) (decomposes)
- SMILES: CCC1(CC(C2=C(C1C(=O)OC)C=C3C(=C2O)C(=O)C4=C(C3=O)C=CC=C4O)OC5CC(C(C(O5)C)OC6CC(C(C(O6)C)OC7CCC(=O)C(O7)C)O)N(C)C)O
- InChI: InChI=1S/C42H53NO15/c1-8-42(51)17-28(33-22(35(42)41(50)52-7)14-23-34(38(33)49)37(48)32-21(36(23)47)10-9-11-26(32)45)56-30-15-24(43(5)6)39(19(3)54-30)58-31-16-27(46)40(20(4)55-31)57-29-13-12-25(44)18(2)53-29/h9-11,14,18-20,24,27-31,35,39-40,45-46,49,51H,8,12-13,15-17H2,1-7H3; Key:USZYSDMBJDPRIF-UHFFFAOYSA-N

Aclarubicin (INN) or aclacinomycin A is an anthracycline drug that is used in the treatment of cancer in China. It was previously approved for use in Europe but was discontinued in 2004 due to being rarely prescribed and unprofitable.

However, it has subsequently been reevaluated due to possible advantages over other chemotherapeutic drugs in the treatment of certain cancers such as acute myeloid leukemia.

Soil bacteria Streptomyces galilaeus can produce aclarubicin.

It can induce histone eviction from chromatin upon intercalation.
