= Gracias Saldanha =

Indian businessman

- Born: Saligão, Goa, India
- Died: 21 July 2012; Mumbai, Maharashtra, India: Portuguese (until 1961); Indian (from 1961)
- Occupations: Chairman & MD of Glenmark Pharmaceuticals
- Children: Glenn Saldanha, Mark Saldanha

Gracias Saldanha was an Indian businessman and CEO of Glenmark Pharmaceuticals. He had two sons, Glenn Saldanha, the current Managing Director & Chairman of Glenmark Pharmaceuticals, and Mark Saldanha, the owner and CEO of Marksans Pharma.
