= Surufatinib =

Chemical compound

Clinical data
- Trade names: Sulanda
- Other names: Sulfatinib; HMPL-012
- ATC code: L01EX24 (WHO)

Legal status
- Legal status: In general: ℞ (Prescription only)

Identifiers
- IUPAC name: N-[2-(Dimethylamino)ethyl]-1-[3-[[4-[(2-methyl-1H-indol-5-yl)oxy]pyrimidin-2-yl]amino]phenyl]methanesulfonamide
- CAS Number: 1308672-74-3
- PubChem CID: 52920501
- IUPHAR/BPS: 9769
- DrugBank: DB15106
- ChemSpider: 57583328
- UNII: B2K5L1L8S9
- ChEMBL: ChEMBL4297190

Chemical and physical data
- Formula: C_{24}H_{28}N_{6}O_{3}S
- Molar mass: 480.59 g·mol^{−1}
- 3D model (JSmol): Interactive image
- SMILES: CC1=CC2=C(N1)C=CC(=C2)OC3=NC(=NC=C3)NC4=CC=CC(=C4)CS(=O)(=O)NCCN(C)C
- InChI: InChI=1S/C24H28N6O3S/c1-17-13-19-15-21(7-8-22(19)27-17)33-23-9-10-25-24(29-23)28-20-6-4-5-18(14-20)16-34(31,32)26-11-12-30(2)3/h4-10,13-15,26-27H,11-12,16H2,1-3H3,(H,25,28,29); Key:TTZSNFLLYPYKIL-UHFFFAOYSA-N

Surufatinib (trade name Sulanda) is pharmaceutical drug for the treatment of cancer. In China, it is approved for late-stage, well-differentiated, extrapancreatic neuroendocrine tumors.

It is also under investigation for the treatment of other types of solid tumors.

Surufatinib targets fibroblast growth factor receptor 1 (FGFR1).
