= Resminostat =

Names
- Preferred IUPAC name (2E)-3-(1-{4-[(Dimethylamino)methyl]benzene-1-sulfonyl}-1H-pyrrol-3-yl)-N-hydroxyprop-2-enamide
- Other names RAS2410; Resminostat 4SC-201

Identifiers
CAS Number	864814-88-0
3D model (JSmol)	Interactive image
ChEBI	CHEBI:231352
ChemSpider	9784710
IUPHAR/BPS	7502
KEGG	D13021
PubChem CID	11609955
UNII	1578EUB98L
CompTox Dashboard (EPA)	DTXSID50235587
- InChI: InChI=1S/C16H19N3O4S/c1-18(2)11-13-3-6-15(7-4-13)24(22,23)19-10-9-14(12-19)5-8-16(20)17-21/h3-10,12,21H,11H2,1-2H3,(H,17,20)/b8-5+ Key: FECGNJPYVFEKOD-VMPITWQZSA-N; InChI=1/C16H19N3O4S/c1-18(2)11-13-3-6-15(7-4-13)24(22,23)19-10-9-14(12-19)5-8-16(20)17-21/h3-10,12,21H,11H2,1-2H3,(H,17,20)/b8-5+ Key: FECGNJPYVFEKOD-VMPITWQZBF
- SMILES: CN(C)CC1=CC=C(C=C1)S(=O)(=O)N2C=CC(=C2)/C=C/C(=O)NO

Properties
Chemical formula	C_{16}H_{19}N_{3}O_{4}S
Molar mass	349.41 g·mol^{−1}
Density	1.282 g/cm^{3}

Pharmacology
ATC code	L01XH07 (WHO)
- Except where otherwise noted, data are given for materials in their standard state (at 25 °C [77 °F], 100 kPa). Infobox references

Resminostat (4SC-201 or RAS2410) is an orally bioavailable inhibitor of histone deacetylases (HDACs), of which inhibitors are antineoplastic agents.

In 2011, the German drug maker 4SC was granted orphan drug designation for resminostat by the US FDA for the treatment of hepatocellular carcinoma (HCC).

In 2016, the FDA granted IND for clinical tests in combination with sorafenib for HCC. 4SC say "In several phase I and phase II trials, resminostat has already demonstrated very good safety and tolerability, alongside promising indications of efficacy."

== Clinical trials ==
Resminostat has undergone a phase I/II clinical trial for K-ras mutated advanced colorectal carcinoma.

It has undergone a phase II clinical trial for relapsed or refractory Hodgkin's lymphoma.

== Mechanism ==
Resminostat restrains the phosphorylation of 4E-BP1 and p70S6k, indicating a disturbance with Akt signalling pathway. The treatment of resminostat leads to a drop of Bim and Bax protein level and Bcl-xL level.

As with other HDAC inhibitors such as pracinostat, the inhibition of HDACs by resminostat results in an accumulation of highly acetylated histones, followed by an abduction of chromatin remodeling, inhibition of tumor suppressor genes transcription and cell division, and finally tumor cell apoptosis.
