= Mitoguazone =

Chemical compound

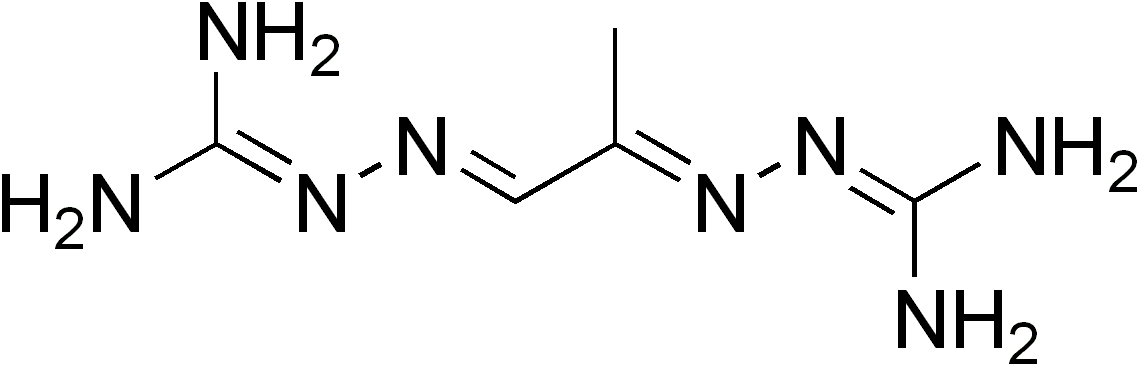

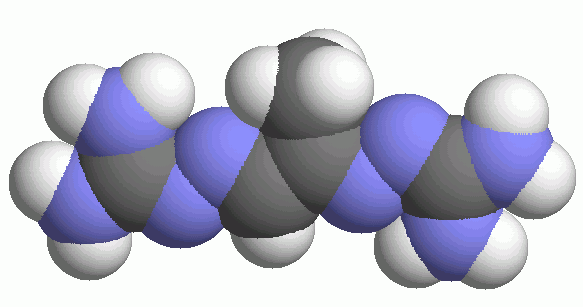

Clinical data
- Other names: 2-[[(1E)-1-(Diaminomethylidenehydrazinylidene)propan-2-ylidene]amino]guanidine
- ATC code: L01XX16 (WHO)

Identifiers
- IUPAC name: (2E,2'E)-2,2'-(1E,2E)-propane-1,2-diylidenedihydrazinecarboximidamide
- CAS Number: 459-86-9
- PubChem CID: 5351154
- ChemSpider: 4508218
- UNII: OD5Q0L447W
- KEGG: D07258
- ChEBI: CHEBI:43996
- CompTox Dashboard (EPA): DTXSID70861943
- ECHA InfoCard: 100.121.515

Chemical and physical data
- Formula: C_{5}H_{12}N_{8}
- Molar mass: 184.207 g·mol^{−1}
- 3D model (JSmol): Interactive image
- SMILES: C\C(\C=N\NC(N)=N)=N/NC(N)=N
- InChI: InChI=1S/C5H12N8/c1-3(11-13-5(8)9)2-10-12-4(6)7/h2H,1H3,(H4,6,7,12)(H4,8,9,13)/b10-2+,11-3+; Key:PKDBCJSWQUOKDO-UHFFFAOYSA-M

Mitoguazone (also known as methylglyoxal bis(guanylhydrazone) or MGBG) is a drug used in chemotherapy.
