= Darinaparsin =

Chemical compound

Clinical data
- Trade names: Darvias; Zinapar
- Other names: SP-02; ZIO-101; DMAs(III)G
- ATC code: L01XX82 (WHO)

Legal status
- Legal status: JP:Rx-only

Identifiers
- IUPAC name: (2S)-2-Amino-5-[[(2R)-1-(carboxymethylamino)-3-dimethylarsanylsulfanyl-1-oxopropan-2-yl]amino]-5-oxopentanoic acid
- CAS Number: 69819-86-9
- PubChem CID: 11683005
- DrugBank: DB06179
- ChemSpider: 9857733
- UNII: 9XX54M675G
- KEGG: D08898
- ChEBI: CHEBI:94295
- ChEMBL: ChEMBL3247378
- CompTox Dashboard (EPA): DTXSID80220108
- ECHA InfoCard: 100.210.066

Chemical and physical data
- Formula: C_{12}H_{22}AsN_{3}O_{6}S
- Molar mass: 411.30 g·mol^{−1}
- 3D model (JSmol): Interactive image
- SMILES: C[As](C)SC[C@@H](C(=O)NCC(=O)O)NC(=O)CC[C@@H](C(=O)O)N
- InChI: InChI=1S/C12H22AsN3O6S/c1-13(2)23-6-8(11(20)15-5-10(18)19)16-9(17)4-3-7(14)12(21)22/h7-8H,3-6,14H2,1-2H3,(H,15,20)(H,16,17)(H,18,19)(H,21,22)/t7-,8-/m0/s1; Key:JGDXFQORBMPJGR-YUMQZZPRSA-N

Darinaparsin (trade names Darvias and Zinapar) is a drug for the treatment of various types of cancer. It is an arsenic-containing derivative of glutathione.

The mechanism of action of darinaparsin is proposed to involve disruption of mitochondrial function, increased production of reactive oxygen species, and modulation of intracellular signal transduction pathways, thereby inducing cell cycle arrest and apoptosis in cancer cells.

== History ==
Darinaparsin and related compounds were first studied in the 1970s at Texas A&M University. It wasn't until 1998, when a connection between organoarsenic compounds and their potential use in cancer chemotherapy was reported, that interest in darinaparsin as a pharmaceutical drug began. Darinaparsin was licensed to Ziopharm Oncology and then Solasia Pharma for drug development. In 2018, Solasia Pharma licensed darinaparsin to HB Human BioScience SAS of Bogota Colombia. HB Human BioScience SAS began the registration process in Colombia, Peru, Ecuador, Venezuela, Chile, Panama, Costa Rica, and Guatemala, while offering darinaparsin on a compassionate use (expanded access) basis.

Darinaparsin was granted Orphan Drug Designation in the US and Europe as a treatment for peripheral T-cell lymphoma (PTCL).

In Japan, darinaparsin was approved for relapsed or refractory PTCL in June 2022.

Darinaparsin was submitted for INVIMA Approval in Colombia on December 12, 2023.
