= Amrubicin =

Chemical compound

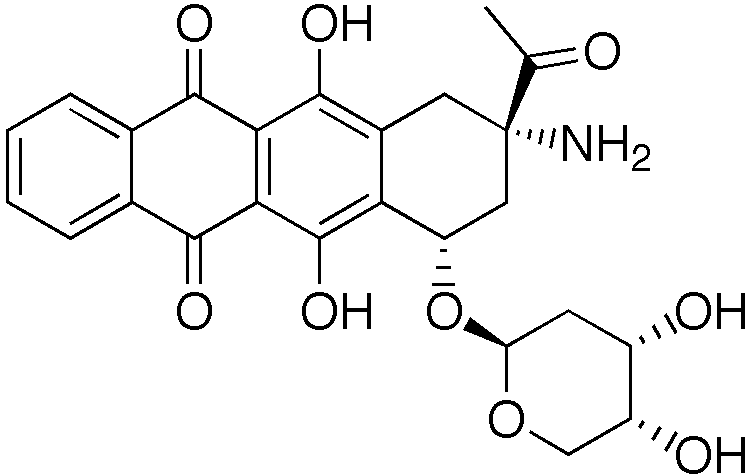

Clinical data
- AHFS/Drugs.com: International Drug Names
- Routes of administration: IV
- ATC code: L01DB10 (WHO)

Legal status
- Legal status: In general: ℞ (Prescription only)

Identifiers
- IUPAC name: (7S,9S)-9-Acetyl-9-amino-7-[(2S,4S,5R)-4,5-dihydroxyoxan-2-yl]oxy-6,11-dihydroxy-8,10-dihydro-7H-tetracene-5,12-dione
- CAS Number: 110267-81-7
- PubChem CID: 178149
- ChemSpider: 2299344
- UNII: 93N13LB4Z2
- KEGG: D08854
- ChEBI: CHEBI:135779
- ChEMBL: ChEMBL1186894
- CompTox Dashboard (EPA): DTXSID30869526

Chemical and physical data
- Formula: C_{25}H_{25}NO_{9}
- Molar mass: 483.473 g·mol^{−1}
- 3D model (JSmol): Interactive image
- SMILES: O=C2c1c(O)c5c(c(O)c1C(=O)c3ccccc23)C[C@](C(=O)C)(N)C[C@@H]5O[C@@H]4OC[C@@H](O)[C@@H](O)C4
- InChI: InChI=1S/C25H25NO9/c1-10(27)25(26)7-13-18(16(8-25)35-17-6-14(28)15(29)9-34-17)24(33)20-19(23(13)32)21(30)11-4-2-3-5-12(11)22(20)31/h2-5,14-17,28-29,32-33H,6-9,26H2,1H3/t14-,15+,16-,17-,25-/m0/s1; Key:VJZITPJGSQKZMX-XDPRQOKASA-N

Amrubicin (INN; previously known as SM-5887) is an anthracycline used in the treatment of lung cancer. It is marketed in Japan since 2002 by Sumitomo under the brand name Calsed.

Amrubicin acts by inhibiting topoisomerase II, and has been compared in clinical trials with topotecan, a Topoisomerase I inhibitor.

It has also been studied for the treatment of bladder carcinoma and gastric cancer.

Amrubicin was the first anthracycline derivative created by de novo synthesis and was first published in 1989 by scientists from Sumitomo.
