= Zorubicin =

Chemical compound

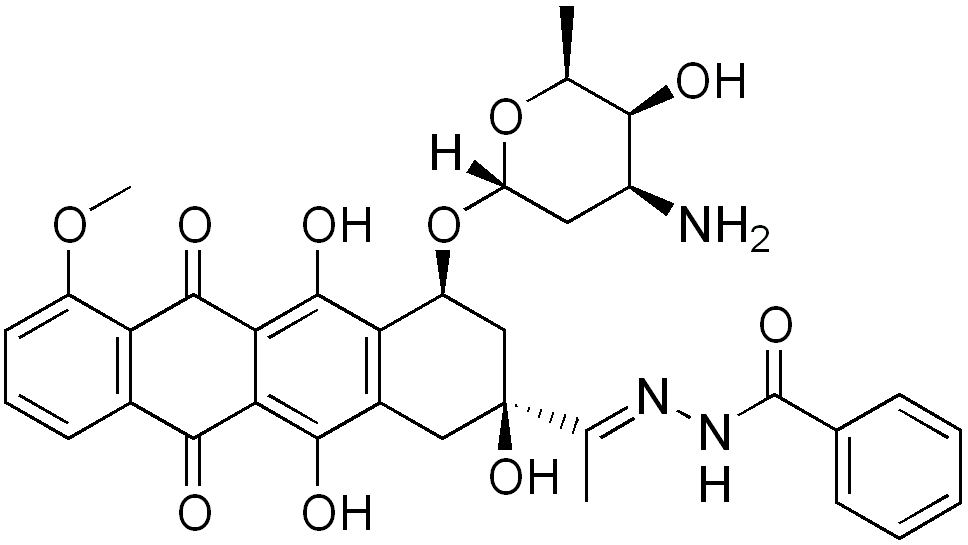

Clinical data
- Trade names: rubidazon, rubidazone
- Routes of administration: i.v.
- ATC code: L01DB05 (WHO)

Legal status
- Legal status: In general: ℞ (Prescription only)

Identifiers
- IUPAC name: (E)-N'-(1-((2S,4S)-4-((2R,4S,5S,6S)-4-amino-5-hydroxy-6-methyltetrahydro-2H-pyran-2-yloxy)-2,5,12-trihydroxy-7-methoxy-6,11-dioxo-1,2,3,4,6,11-hexahydrotetracen-2-yl)ethylidene)benzohydrazide
- CAS Number: 54083-22-6
- PubChem CID: 9595290
- DrugBank: DB11618
- ChemSpider: 7869436
- UNII: V25F9362OP
- CompTox Dashboard (EPA): DTXSID4043852

Chemical and physical data
- Formula: C_{34}H_{35}N_{3}O_{10}
- Molar mass: 645.665 g·mol^{−1}
- 3D model (JSmol): Interactive image
- SMILES: OC1=C(C(C4=C(C=CC=C4OC)C3=O)=O)C3=C(O)C2=C1[C@@H](O[C@]5([H])O[C@@H](C)[C@@H](O)[C@@H](N)C5)C[C@@](/[C@@](C)=N/NC(C6=CC=CC=C6)=O)(O)C2
- InChI: InChI=1S/C34H35N3O10/c1-15-28(38)20(35)12-23(46-15)47-22-14-34(44,16(2)36-37-33(43)17-8-5-4-6-9-17)13-19-25(22)32(42)27-26(30(19)40)29(39)18-10-7-11-21(45-3)24(18)31(27)41/h4-11,15,20,22-23,28,38,40,42,44H,12-14,35H2,1-3H3,(H,37,43)/b36-16+/t15-,20-,22-,23-,28+,34-/m0/s1; Key:FBTUMDXHSRTGRV-ALTNURHMSA-N

Zorubicin (INN) is a benzoylhydrazone derivative of the anthracycline antineoplastic antibiotic daunorubicin. Zorubicin intercalates into DNA; it as well interacts with topoisomerase II and inhibits DNA polymerases and therefore is used to treat cancer.
