= Tunlametinib =

Chemical compound

Clinical data
- Other names: HL-085
- ATC code: L01EE06 (WHO)

Legal status
- Legal status: Rx in China

Identifiers
- IUPAC name: 4-Fluoro-5-(2-fluoro-4-iodoanilino)-N-(2-hydroxyethoxy)-1,3-benzothiazole-6-carboxamide
- CAS Number: 1801756-06-8
- PubChem CID: 71621329
- ChemSpider: 115006753
- UNII: IF25NR1PV3
- KEGG: D13236
- ChEMBL: ChEMBL5095241

Chemical and physical data
- Formula: C_{16}H_{12}F_{2}IN_{3}O_{3}S
- Molar mass: 491.25 g·mol^{−1}

Tunlametinib is a pharmaceutical drug for the treatment of cancer. It is an inhibitor of mitogen-activated protein kinase kinase.

In China, tunlametinib was approved in 2024 for the treatment of patients with NRAS-mutated advanced melanoma who were previously treated with a PD-1/PD-L1 targeting agent.

It is also being studied for use in combination with vemurafenib in patients with advanced BRAF V600-mutant solid tumors.
