= Randy Jirtle =

American geneticist

Randy L. Jirtle
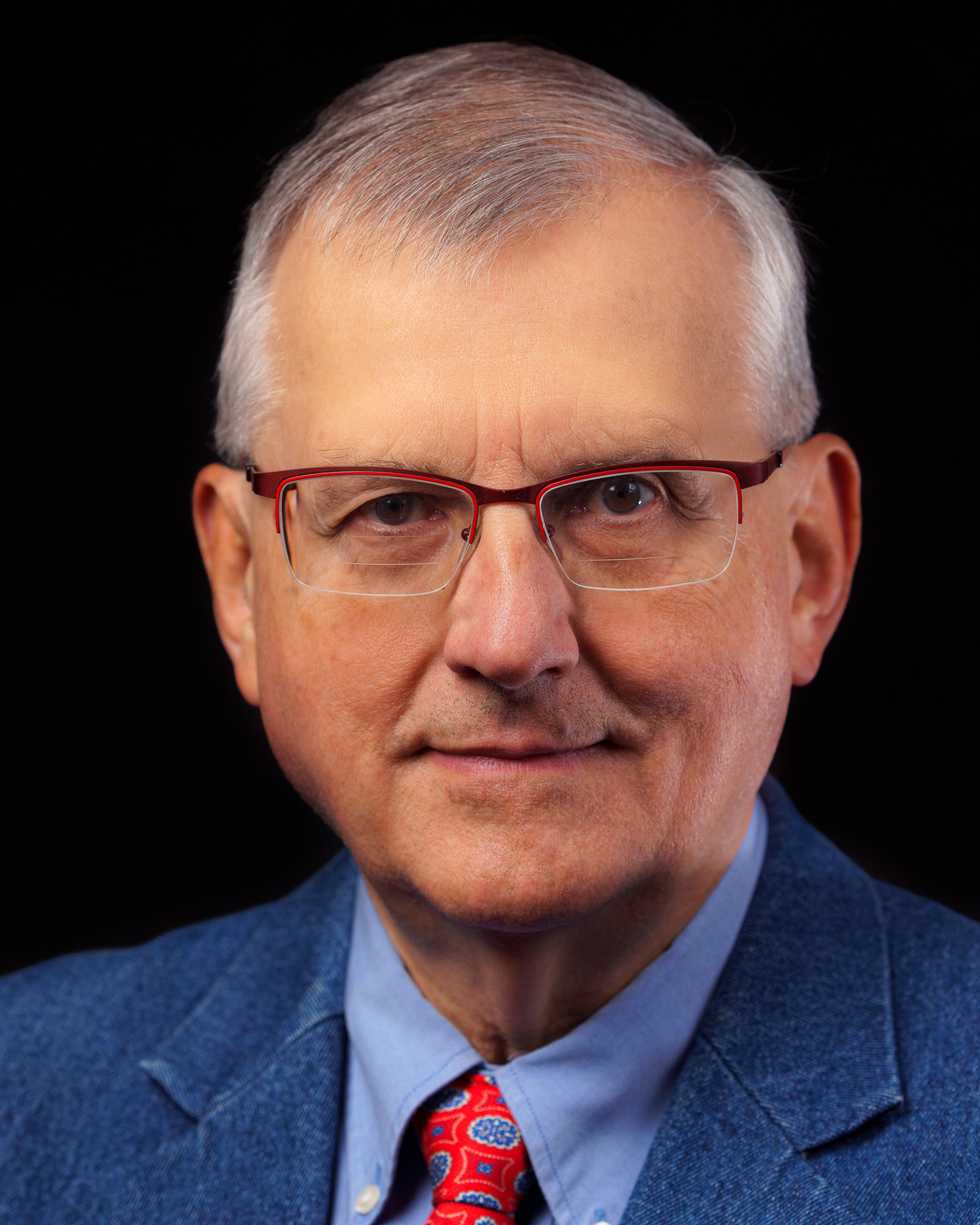
- Randy Jirtle in 2020
- Born: November 9, 1947 (age 78); Kewaunee, Wisconsin, U.S.
- Education: University of Wisconsin-Madison
- Known for: Evolution of genomic imprinting and identifying imprinted genes. Showing that environmental agents alter the epigenome, thereby affecting health and disease susceptibility in adulthood.
- Scientific career
- Fields: Epigenetics, Genomic imprinting, Radiation biology
- Workplaces: Duke University, University of Wisconsin-Madison, University of Bedfordshire, North Carolina State University, University of Adelaide
- Website: www.geneimprint.com

Randy Jirtle (born November 9, 1947) is an American biologist noted for his research in epigenetics, the branch of biology that deals with inherited information that does not reside in the nucleotide sequence of DNA. Jirtle retired from Duke University, Durham, NC in 2012. He is presently Professor of Epigenetics in the Department of Biological Sciences at North Carolina State University, Raleigh, NC. Jirtle is noted for his research on genomic imprinting, and for his use of the Agouti mouse model to investigate the effect of environmental agents on the mammalian epigenome and disease susceptibility.

== Early life and career ==
Jirtle was born in Kewaunee, Wisconsin. He attended Algoma Public High School and the University of Wisconsin–Madison, graduating with a B.S. degree in nuclear engineering. For graduate school, he remained at the University of Wisconsin-Madison, obtaining an M.S. in Radiation Biology in 1973 and a PhD in 1976 (Major: Radiation Biology; Minor: Statistics). Following post-doctoral studies, Jirtle was appointed assistant professor of radiology at Duke University in 1980, and became Professor of Radiation Oncology in 1990 and Associate Professor of Pathology in 1998. He remained at Duke until 2012, and is currently Professor of Epigenetics in the Department of Biological Sciences at North Carolina State University, Raleigh, NC.

== Research ==
Jirtle's early research examined the influence of radiation on biological systems. He developed the first in vivo clonogenic assay for hepatocytes, and used it to quantify their survival when exposed to X-rays and neutrons. Jirtle also used this clonal assay to study the phenomenon of liver regeneration. These early studies ultimately led to the identification of the insulin-like growth factor receptor (IGF2R) as a human tumor suppressor gene, and to studies in the emerging field of genomic imprinting, since murine IGF2R was shown at that time to be imprinted.

Jirtle initially took a phylogenetic approach to the study of genomic imprinting, examining allelic expression, in a range of mammalian orders (and in non-mammalian vertebrates), of the genes encoding the IGF2R (also known as the cation-independent mannose 6-phosphate receptor, CI-MPR) and its ligand, IGF2. He was the first to show that imprinting arose in an ancestor of metatherian and therian mammals, which feature placentation and live birth, but is not a feature of prototherian (egg-laying) mammals.

Parent-of-origin-dependent monoallelic expression of imprinted genes is regulated by imprinted control regions (ICRs) which are differentially methylated during gametogenesis, and the Jirtle laboratory recently identified 1,488 hemi-methylated candidate imprint control regions (ICRs) in the human genome - the human imprintome. The group has now developed a custom methylation array to allow targeted investigation of the ICRs of the human imprintome ]. The availability of this research tool will be useful in determining the contribution of imprinted genes to human health, and to diseases and disorders such as Alzheimer’s disease.

In 2003, Jirtle provided molecular evidence that maternal dietary supplementation of Agouti viable yellow (A^{vy}) mice with methyl donors (i.e. folic acid, choline, vitamin B_{12}, and betaine) altered the coat color distribution and disease susceptibility in genetically identical offspring by increasing DNA methylation at the A^{vy} locus. A subsequent study showed that the phyto-estrogen, genistein, modifies the fetal epigenome, alters coat color, and protects Agouti offspring from obesity even though it is not capable of donating a methyl group. This article was selected as the ‘Classic Paper of the Year’ in 2011 by Environmental Health Perspectives. It was followed by a study that showed that genistein and methyl donor supplementation can counteract detrimental epigenetic effects induced by a controversial xenobiotic chemical, bisphenol A (BPA). Jirtle used the A^{vy} mouse system to show that embryonic stem cells exposed in vivo to low doses of a physical agent, X-rays, induce positive adaptive responses in the offspring by altering the epigenome, and that these changes are mitigated by antioxidants.

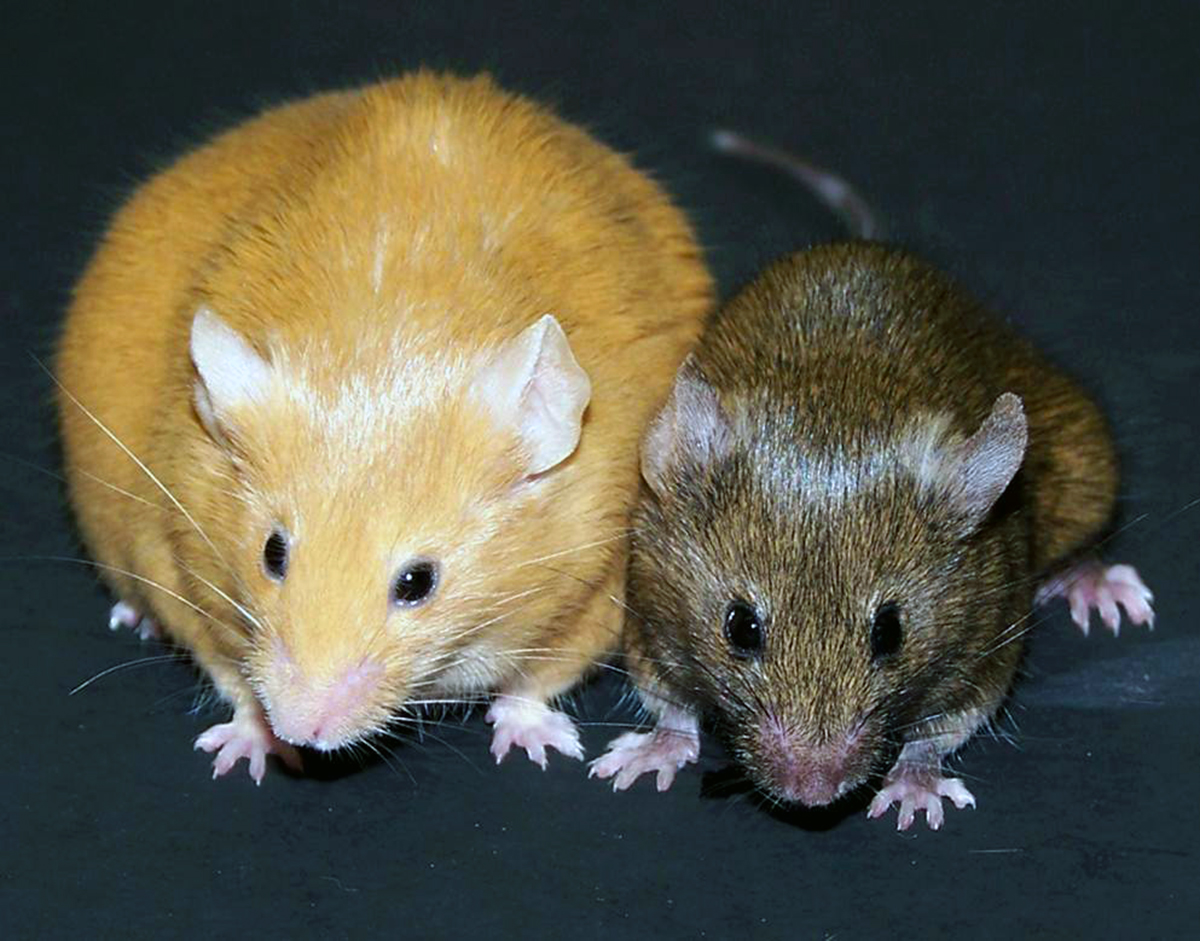
Agouti Mice These mice are genetically identical despite looking phenotypically different. The mouse on the left's mother was fed Bisphenol A (BPA) with a normal mouse diet and the mouse on the right's mother was fed BPA with a methyl-rich diet. The left mouse is yellow and obese, while the right mouse is brown and healthy.

He has edited a book on Liver Regeneration and Carcinogenesis, and two books on Environmental Epigenomics in Health and Disease. Jirtle is on the editorial board of the journals Epigenomics published by Taylor & Francis, Epigenetics published by Taylor & Francis, and Environmental Epigenetics published by Oxford University Press.

== Awards ==
Jirtle has received a number of awards in recognition of his achievements. He was honored in 2006 with the Distinguished Achievement Award from the College of Engineering at the University of Wisconsin-Madison. In 2007 Jirtle was nominated to be Time Magazine’s Person of the Year by Dr. Nora Volkow, Director of the National Institute on Drug Abuse. He was a featured scientist on the PBS NOVA television program on epigenetics in 2007 entitled Ghost in Your Genes. He was the inaugural recipient of the Epigenetic Medicine Award. In 2009, Jirtle received the STARS Lecture Award in Nutrition and Cancer from the National Cancer Institute. Dr. Jirtle was invited in 2012 to present the NIH Director’s WALS lecture. He received the Linus Pauling Award from the Institute of Functional Medicine in 2014. ShortCutsTV produced a documentary in 2017 based upon Jirtle’s epigenetic research entitled, Are You What Your Mother Ate? The Agouti Mouse Study He received in 2018 the Northern Communities Health Foundation Visiting Professorship Award at University of Adelaide in Australia. Personalized Lifestyle Medicine Institute presented Jirtle with the Research and Innovation Leadership Award in 2019. In 2019, he also received the Alexander Hollaender Award from the Environmental Mutagenesis and Genomics Society stating, “The award recognizes Dr. Jirtle’s discovery that the environment can influence inheritance of phenotypic traits through epigenetic reprogramming representing one of the most important scientific advances of the 21st century.”
