= Dibutyl tartrate =

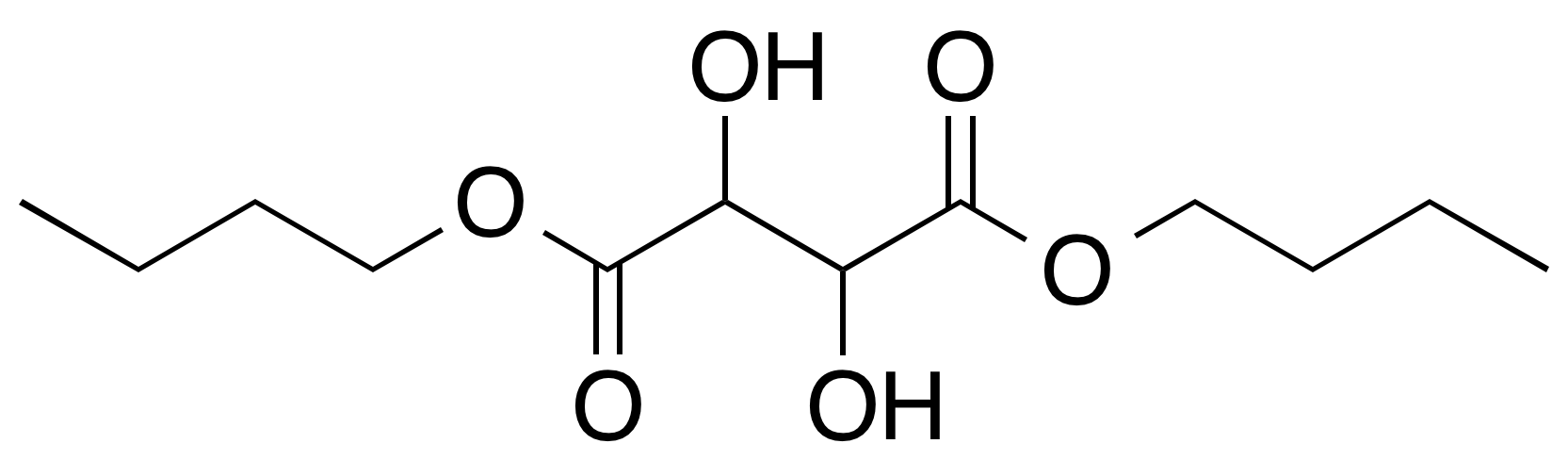
- Dibutyl tartrate, with no stereochemical detail

Names
- IUPAC name dibutyl 2,3-dihydroxybutanedioate

Identifiers
CAS Number	87-92-3
3D model (JSmol)	Interactive image
ChemSpider	190760
ECHA InfoCard	100.001.623
EC Number	201-784-9
PubChem CID	220014
UNII	2D1V32IF1E
CompTox Dashboard (EPA)	DTXSID10883265
- InChI: InChI=1S/C12H22O6/c1-3-5-7-17-11(15)9(13)10(14)12(16)18-8-6-4-2/h9-10,13-14H,3-8H2,1-2H3 Key: PCYQQSKDZQTOQG-UHFFFAOYSA-N
- SMILES: CCCCOC(=O)C(C(C(=O)OCCCC)O)O

Properties
Chemical formula	C_{12}H_{22}O_{6}
Molar mass	262.302 g·mol^{−1}
Density	1.091
Melting point	21 °C (70 °F; 294 K)
Boiling point	320 °C (608 °F; 593 K)
Chiral rotation ([α]_{D})	+11.5
Refractive index (n_{D})	1.447

Hazards
Flash point	91 °C (196 °F; 364 K)
Autoignition temperature	284 °C (543 °F; 557 K)
- Except where otherwise noted, data are given for materials in their standard state (at 25 °C [77 °F], 100 kPa). Infobox references

Dibutyl tartrate is a di-ester of tartaric acid and butanol. It has been used as a chiral oil to separate enantiomers in chromatography. Another use is in farinographs. Yet another use is as a plasticizer. The material is classed as "green" as it is made from natural products, and is biodegradable.

== Properties ==
The dielectric constant of dibutyl tartrate is 9.4
