= Rabacfosadine =

Chemical compound

Clinical data
- Trade names: Tanovea
- Other names: GS-9219
- AHFS/Drugs.com: Veterinary Use
- License data: US DailyMed: Rabacfosadine
- Routes of administration: Intravenous
- ATCvet code: QL01BB90 (WHO)

Legal status
- Legal status: US: ℞-only

Identifiers
- CAS Number: 859209-74-8
- PubChem CID: 16047979
- DrugBank: DB12762
- ChemSpider: 4486268
- UNII: M39BO43J9W
- KEGG: D10723
- ChEMBL: ChEMBL1823518
- CompTox Dashboard (EPA): DTXSID10235245

Chemical and physical data
- Formula: C_{11}H_{35}N_{8}O_{6}P
- Molar mass: 406.425 g·mol^{−1}
- 3D model (JSmol): Interactive image
- SMILES: CCOC( = O)[C@H](C)NP( = O)(COCCN1C = NC2 = C1N = C(N = C2NC3CC3)N)N[C@@H](C)C( = O)OCC
- InChI: InChI=1S/C21H35N8O6P/c1-5-34-19(30)13(3)27-36(32,28-14(4)20(31)35-6-2)12-33-10-9-29-11-23-16-17(24-15-7-8-15)25-21(22)26-18(16)29/h11,13-15H,5-10,12H2,1-4H3,(H2,27,28,32)(H3,22,24,25,26)/t13-,14-/m0/s1; Key:ANSPEDQTHURSFQ-KBPBESRZSA-N

Rabacfosadine, sold under the brand name Tanovea, is a guanine nucleotide analog used for the treatment of lymphoma in dogs. It was developed by Gilead Sciences as GS-9219.

The active form of rabacfosadine is a chain-terminating inhibitor of the major deoxyribonucleic acid (DNA) polymerases. In vitro studies have demonstrated that rabacfosadine inhibits DNA synthesis, resulting in S phase arrest and induction of apoptosis. It also inhibits the proliferation of lymphocytes in dogs with naturally occurring lymphoma.

Rabacfosadine was granted conditional approval by the US Food and Drug Administration (FDA) in December 2016, and became the first medication to receive full approval for the treatment of canine lymphoma in July 2021.

== Veterinary uses ==
In July 2021, the U.S. Food and Drug Administration (FDA) approved Tanovea to treat lymphoma in dogs. Lymphoma, also called lymphosarcoma, is a type of cancer that can affect many species, including dogs. Rabacfosadine is the first conditionally approved new animal drug for dogs to achieve the FDA's full approval.

== Adverse effects ==
Common side effects of rabacfosadine are decreased white blood cell count, diarrhea, vomiting, decreased appetite or loss of appetite, weight loss, decreased activity level, and skin problems. Other side effects may occur.
