= Etoglucid =

Chemical compound

Clinical data
- Other names: Diglycidyltriethylene glycol
- ATC code: L01AG01 (WHO)

Identifiers
- IUPAC name: 2-[12-(oxiran-2-yl)-2,5,8,11-tetraoxadodecan-1-yl]oxirane
- CAS Number: 1954-28-5
- PubChem CID: 16058
- ChemSpider: 15246
- UNII: 4F9KUA0T4D
- KEGG: D07256
- ChEMBL: ChEMBL460287
- CompTox Dashboard (EPA): DTXSID80862800
- ECHA InfoCard: 100.016.168

Chemical and physical data
- Formula: C_{12}H_{22}O_{6}
- Molar mass: 262.302 g·mol^{−1}
- 3D model (JSmol): Interactive image
- SMILES: O(CCOCCOCC1OC1)CCOCC2OC2
- InChI: InChI=1S/C12H22O6/c1(13-3-5-15-7-11-9-17-11)2-14-4-6-16-8-12-10-18-12/h11-12H,1-10H2; Key:UMILHIMHKXVDGH-UHFFFAOYSA-N

Etoglucid is a drug used in chemotherapy. It is an epoxide compound.
