= Envafolimab =

Cancer immunotherapy medication

Monoclonal antibody
- Type: Single-chain variable fragment
- Target: PD-L1

Clinical data
- Drug class: Antineoplastic agent
- ATC code: L01FF15 (WHO)

Identifiers
- CAS Number: 2102192-68-5
- PubChem CID: 381609252
- DrugBank: DB15769
- UNII: ES1M06M6QH
- KEGG: D13233

Envafolimab is an anti-PD-L1 nanobody used in cancer immunotherapy. It has been approved in China for the treatment of microsatellite instability-high (MSI-H) or MisMatch Repair deficient (dMMR) solid tumours. Envafolimab (KN035) has obtained the US FDA's orphan drug designation for advanced biliary tract cancer.
