= Aumolertinib =

Drug for treatment of cancer

Clinical data
- Trade names: Ameile, others
- Other names: Almonertinib; HS-10296
- Routes of administration: By mouth
- ATC code: L01EB11 (WHO)

Legal status
- Legal status: EU: Rx-only; CN: Rx-only

Identifiers
- IUPAC name: N-[5-[[4-(1-Cyclopropylindol-3-yl)pyrimidin-2-yl]amino]-2-[2-(dimethylamino)ethyl-methylamino]-4-methoxyphenyl]prop-2-enamide
- CAS Number: 1899921-05-1
- PubChem CID: 121280087
- IUPHAR/BPS: 11136
- DrugBank: DB16640
- ChemSpider: 75535991
- UNII: T4RS462G19
- ChEMBL: ChEMBL4761468

Chemical and physical data
- Formula: C_{30}H_{35}N_{7}O_{2}
- Molar mass: 525.657 g·mol^{−1}
- 3D model (JSmol): Interactive image
- SMILES: CN(C)CCN(C)C1=CC(=C(C=C1NC(=O)C=C)NC2=NC=CC(=N2)C3=CN(C4=CC=CC=C43)C5CC5)OC
- InChI: InChI=1S/C30H35N7O2/c1-6-29(38)32-24-17-25(28(39-5)18-27(24)36(4)16-15-35(2)3)34-30-31-14-13-23(33-30)22-19-37(20-11-12-20)26-10-8-7-9-21(22)26/h6-10,13-14,17-20H,1,11-12,15-16H2,2-5H3,(H,32,38)(H,31,33,34); Key:DOEOECWDNSEFDN-UHFFFAOYSA-N

Aumolertinib, sold under the brand name Ameile among others, is an anti-cancer medication used for the treatment of lung cancer. It is an epidermal growth factor receptor (EGFR) tyrosine kinase inhibitor.

== Medical uses ==
In China, aumolertinib is approved for the treatment of people with EGFR T790M mutation—positive non-small-cell lung cancer who have progressed on or after other EGFR tyrosine kinase inhibitor therapy.

In the European Union, aumolertinib, as monotherapy, is indicated for the first-line treatment of adults with advanced non-small-cell lung cancer whose tumors have EGFR exon 19 deletions or exon 21 (L858R) substitution mutations; and for the treatment of adults with advanced EGFR T790M mutation positive NSCLC.

== Society and culture ==
=== Legal status ===
In December 2025, the Committee for Medicinal Products for Human Use of the European Medicines Agency adopted a positive opinion, recommending the granting of a marketing authorization for the medicinal product Aumseqa, intended for the treatment of non-small cell lung cancer (NSCLC). The applicant for this medicinal product is SFL Pharmaceuticals Deutschland GmbH. Aumolertinib was authorized for medical use in the European Union in February 2026.

=== Names ===
Aumolertinib is the international nonproprietary name.

Aumolertinib is sold under the brand names Ameile and Aumseqa.
