= Pracinostat =

Names
- Preferred IUPAC name (2E)-3-{2-Butyl-1-[2-(diethylamino)ethyl]-1H-1,3-benzimidazol-5-yl}-N-hydroxyprop-2-enamide
- Other names Pracinostat

Identifiers
CAS Number	929016-96-6
3D model (JSmol)	Interactive image
ChEBI	CHEBI:95071
ChemSpider	25027185
PubChem CID	49855250
UNII	GPO2JN4UON
CompTox Dashboard (EPA)	DTXSID00239196
- InChI: InChI=1S/C20H30N4O2/c1-4-7-8-19-21-17-15-16(10-12-20(25)22-26)9-11-18(17)24(19)14-13-23(5-2)6-3/h9-12,15,26H,4-8,13-14H2,1-3H3,(H,22,25)/b12-10+ Key: JHDKZFFAIZKUCU-ZRDIBKRKSA-N; InChI=1/C20H30N4O2/c1-4-7-8-19-21-17-15-16(10-12-20(25)22-26)9-11-18(17)24(19)14-13-23(5-2)6-3/h9-12,15,26H,4-8,13-14H2,1-3H3,(H,22,25)/b12-10+ Key: JHDKZFFAIZKUCU-ZRDIBKRKBK
- SMILES: CCCCC1=NC2=C(N1CCN(CC)CC)C=CC(=C2)/C=C/C(=O)NO

Properties
Chemical formula	C_{20}H_{30}N_{4}O_{2}
Molar mass	358.486 g·mol^{−1}
Density	1.1±0.1 g/cm^{3}
- Except where otherwise noted, data are given for materials in their standard state (at 25 °C [77 °F], 100 kPa). Infobox references

Pracinostat (SB939) is an orally bioavailable, small-molecule histone deacetylase (HDAC) inhibitor based on hydroxamic acid with potential anti-tumor activity characterized by favorable physicochemical, pharmaceutical, and pharmacokinetic properties.

== Activity ==
Pracinostat selectively inhibits HDAC class I, II, IV without class III and HDAC6 in class IIb, but has no effect on other Zn-binding enzymes, receptors, and ion channels. It accumulates in tumor cells and exerts a continuous inhibition to histone deacetylase, resulting in acetylated histones accumulation, chromatin remodeling, tumor suppressor genes transcription, and ultimately, apoptosis of tumor cells.

== Clinical medication ==
Clinical studies suggests that pracinostat has potential best pharmacokinetic properties when compared to other oral HDAC inhibitors. In March 2014, pracinostat has granted Orphan Drug for acute myelocytic leukemia (AML) and for the treatment of T-cell lymphoma by the Food and Drug Administration.
