= Genmab =

Danish healthcare company

Genmab A/S
- Type: Public
- Traded as: Nasdaq Copenhagen: GMAB; Nasdaq: GMAB (ADR); OMX Copenhagen 25 component
- Industry: Biotechnology
- Founded: 1999; 27 years ago
- Founder: Florian Schönharting and Lisa Drakeman
- Headquarters: Copenhagen, Denmark
- Number of locations: 4 (2023)
- Key people: Jan Van de Winkel (president and CEO, from 2010); Deirdre P. Connelly (Board chair)
- Products: DARZALEX/ DARZALEX FASPRO; EPKINLY/TEPKINLY; Kesimpta; RYBREVANT; TALVEY; TECVAYLI; TEPEZZA; Tivdak
- Revenue: DKK 16.474 billion (2023)
- Operating income: DKK 5.321 billion (2023)
- Net income: DKK 4.352 billion (2023)
- Number of employees: 2,204 (2023)
- Website: Genmab.com

Genmab A/S is a Danish biotechnology company, founded in February 1999 by Florian Schönharting, at the time managing director of BankInvest Biomedical venture fund. The company is based in Copenhagen, Denmark – internationally, it operates through the subsidiaries Genmab B.V. in Utrecht, The Netherlands, Genmab U.S., Inc. in Princeton, New Jersey, US, Genmab K.K. in Tokyo, Japan, Genmab Germany GmbH in München, Germany and Genmab (Suzhou) Co., Ltd. in Suzhou, China. Genmab is listed on the Copenhagen Stock Exchange in Denmark, with American depositary receipts traded on the NASDAQ in the US.

== Technology ==
Genmab's technology is licensed from Medarex to create fully human high affinity antibodies using transgenic mice. These antibodies are less likely to elicit an allergic reaction and other side effects compared with other types of man-made antibodies containing other animal proteins because the IgG antibodies produced have human proteins. This technology is called the HuMab-Mouse technology. One benefit of using this type of technology is that there is no need for humanization or complicated genetic engineering to make this antibody fit for humans which cuts down on expenses and time spent developing it. It can be generated within months and can be selected to bind to specific antigens such as tumor cells and other infectious agents.

Genmab has also developed its own technology, called UniBody, which is used to make smaller antibodies in contrast to traditional full-size monoclonal antibodies. The smaller size allows for better distribution over larger target areas like tumors. The UniBody can only bind to one site and doesn’t elicit a harmful immune response by binding to two sites and over-activating cell growth. It does not kill target cells but rather silences or inhibits them. Thus it can be used to treat certain cancers, inflammations, allergies and asthmas, where killing the cell isn’t the objective.

The technology modifies the human IgG4 antibody. Normally the IgG4 is considered inert and doesn’t elicit an immune response. However, they are also unstable and fall apart easily, which makes them unsuitable for therapeutic use. Genmab changes the shape of the IgG4 antibody by eliminating the hinge, the part of the antibody that creates the “Y” shape. This halves the antibody, creating a smaller version now known as their UniBody. This smaller version can only bind to one site and does not stimulate cancer cells to grow.

== History ==
Genmab was founded as a European spin-off of American Biotech company Medarex in February 1999. Danish investment firm BankInvest, under Florian Schönharting, provided the seed investment for the company to start up in Copenhagen. Like Medarex, Genmab began work producing monoclonal antibodies for life-threatening or debilitating diseases. Rising quickly in the Biotech world, Genmab attracted many investors, especially venture capital firms. The company went public in October 2000, earning DKK 1.56 billion, and had a second public offering in January 2006, yielding DKK 800 million.

The company's initial R&D location was a nine-story building in Utrecht Science Park, in the Netherlands; this was replaced with an "R&D Center" also in Utrecht, in June 2018. By mid-2019, this new facility was at capacity, and plans were set afoot to build an adjacent, connected facility.

By 2001, Medarex and Genmab had come back together in a drug development partnership, which highlighted the manufacturing deficit and clinical development expertise of Genmab relative to Medarex.

In 2005, the Biotechnology Industry Organization (BIO) and the Long Island Life Sciences Initiative honored Genmab with a James D. Watson Helix Award.

2008 saw the company purchasing a 22,000-litre, 36-acre antibody manufacturing plant in Brooklyn Park, Minnesota from PDL BioPharma, with plans to retain all 170 employees thereat. However, the company ran into financial trouble originating from several quarters, and a decision to sell the facility was reached in late 2009, after Genmab had started producing development scale batches from the facility. During the 2008 financial crisis, GlaxoSmithKline exited oncology, which impacted co-development of ofatumumab, an oncology-directed product. In tandem with the sale of the plant, the company reorganized and planned to dismiss about 300 employees. Selling the facility was difficult due to the Great Recession; by 2012, Genmab wrote-off the entire facility from the company's balance sheets. A sale of the facility to Baxter International came in February 2013.

Following the failed strategy of in-housing manufacturing, Genmab chose to thereafter completely outsource both manufacturing and the conduct of clinical trials.

The Company's first product, Arzerra (ofatumumab) reached the US market in 2009 for refractory chronic lymphocytic leukemia.

=== Executive history ===
Lisa N. Drakeman, Ph.D. had been a vice president at Medarex and wife of Donald Drakeman, Medarex's CEO and President at the time. Drakeman was one of Genmab's co-founders and was appointed chief executive officer (CEO) of the company upon incorporation in 1999, also joining the board of directors. As of 2002, Drakeman remained in the CEO role, but by 2010 she had announced her retirement.

In 2010, Jan Van de Winkel, a co-founder of the firm, was appointed as President and CEO of Genmab. Since the company started in 1999, he had been Genmab's chief scientific officer (CSO); he had concurrently served as head of research, then president of R&D. As of 2019, Van de Winkel remained CEO of the firm. Van de Winkel is a scientist, having produced more than 300 publications during his career.

=== Partnerships ===
Amgen: In May 1999, Genmab entered a sub-license agreement with Amgen where it would gain rights to the IL15 antibodies. In October 2001, this was replaced by a direct license agreement where Amgen retained exclusive commercialization options for the products through phase II. Amgen has also expanded its agreement to a new antibody program targeting additional disease targets. Amgen has discontinued development of the IL15 antibody, AMG 714, in psoriasis and rheumatoid arthritis based on disappointing results from recent clinical studies. Amgen is exploring options to maximize the value of this asset, but as this time, no further internal development of a lead indication is planned.

GlaxoSmithKline: In December 2006, Genmab entered a deal with GlaxoSmithKline to co-develop and commercialize ofatumumab, a drug that could be used for treatment in CD20 positive B-cell chronic lymphocytic leukemia, follicular non-Hodgkin’s lymphoma, rheumatoid arthritis and other indications. The agreement gave Genmab a license fee of DKK 582 million (US$102 million) and GSK bought 4,471,202 shares of Genmab for DKK 2,033 million (US$359 million). The potential value of this agreement could be DKK 12.0 billion (US$2.1 billion) if all milestones are reached and commercial success is reached in the fields of cancer, autoimmune, and inflammatory disease. The intention of GlaxoSmithKline to exit oncology, disagreement around milestones reached, and financial difficulties of Genmab, led to re-negotiation of the partnership in mid-2010, resulting in an immediate US$135 million payment by GlaxoSmithKline and future financial and licensing concessions on the part of Genmab.

In addition, Genmab has collaborations with Roche (RG1507, a monoclonal antibody directed against IGF-1R, collaboration was terminated in 2009)

In April 2024, the company announced it would acquire ProfoundBio for $1.8 billion.

In September 2025, Genmab announced it would acquire Merus N.V.—a Dutch biotech company developing late-stage head and neck cancer drug—for ~$8 billion.

== Products ==
The company has 8 approved antibodies (monoclonal and bispecific) used in 8 marketed products, covering cancer indications and autoimmune diseases.

Proprietary, marketed with partners:

- Epkinly/Tepkinly (epcoritamab) for the treatment of Relapsed/refractory diffuse large B-cell lymphoma (DLBCL) (AbbVie)
- Tivdak (tisotumab vedotin) for the treatment of previously treated recurrent or metastatic cervical cancer (Seagen)

Marketed by partners:

- Darzalex (IV) (daratumumab) / Darzalex Faspro (SC) (daratumumab and hyaluronidase) for the treatment of all stages of multiple myeloma as combination therapy or monotherapy, and for the treatment of newly diagnosed amyloid light-chain (AL) amyloidosis (Janssen)
- Kesimpta (ofatumumab) for the treatment of relapsing remitting multiple sclerosis (Novartis)
- Rybrevant (amivantamab) for the treatment of non-small-cell lung cancer (EGFR exon 20 insertion mutations) (Janssen)
- Talvey (talquetamab) for the treatment of relapsed/refractory MM (Janssen)
- Tecvayli (teclistamab) for the treatment of relapsed/refractory MM (Janssen)
- Tepezza (teprotumumab) for the treatment of thyroid eye disease (Horizon)

Furthermore both Genmab and its partners have a whole range of antibody programs, building on Genmab technologies, in clinical and pre-clinical development in both cancer and autoimmune diseases.
Genmab have several late stage clinical programs for tisotumab vedotin (cervical cancer, ovarian cancer and solid tumors) and epcoritamab (B-cell non-Hodgkin lymphoma and Relapsed/refractory Follicular lymphoma).
The partners have, among others, clinical programs for daratumumab (non-MM blood cancers), amivantamab (gastric cancer and esophageal cancer), Mim8 (Factor VIII mimetic bi-specific antibody) (Haemophilia A), inclacumab (VOC in Sickle cell disease) and teprotumumab (diffuse cutaneous systemic sclerosis).

== Pipeline ==
=== Proprietary Products ===
==== Approved Medicines/Products ====
Approved Product	Target	Developed by	Disease indications	Approval Year
EPKINLY/TEPKINLY (epcoritamab)	CD3, CD20	50:50 Genmab/AbbVie	Relapsed/refractory diffuse large B-cell lymphoma (DLBCL)	2023
Tivdak (tisotumab vedotin)	TF	50:50 Genmab/Seagen	Recurrent or metastatic Cervical cancer	2021

==== Pipeline, Including Further Development for Approved Medicines ====
Product	Target	Developed by	Disease indications	Most Advanced Development Phase
Epcoritamab	CD3, CD20	50:50 Genmab/AbbVie	Relapsed/refractory DLBCL	III
"	"	"	Relapsed/refractory Follicular lymphoma (FL)	III
"	"	"	First line DLBCL	III
"	"	"	B-cell non-Hodgkin lymphoma (B-NHL)	II
"	"	"	Relapsed/refractory chronic lymphocytic leukemia (CLL) & Richter's syndrome	I/II
"	"	"	Indolent NHL, pediatric patients	I
Tisotumab vedotin	TF	50:50 Genmab/Seagen	Cervical cancer	III
"	"	"	Solid tumors	II
Acasunlimab (GEN1046/BNT311)	PD-L1, 4-1BB	50:50 Genmab/BioNTech	Non-small-cell lung cancer (NSCLC)	II
"	"	"	Advanced endometrial cancer	II
"	"	"	Solid tumors	I/II
Tecaginlimab (GEN1042/BNT312)	CD40, 4-1BB	"	Solid tumors	II
HexaBody-CD38 (GEN3014)	CD38	Genmab (under an exclusive worldwide license/option agreement with Janssen)	Hematologic malignancies	II
DuoBody-CD3xB7H4 (GEN1047)	CD3, B7H4	Genmab	Solid tumors	II
HexaBody-CD27 (GEN1053/BNT313)	CD27	50:50 Genmab/BioNTech	Solid tumors	I
GEN1056 (BNT322)	Undisclosed	"	Solid tumors	I
DuoBody-CD3xCD20; GEN3017	CD3, CD20	Genmab	Relapsed/refractory Hodgkin lymphoma (HL) & NHL	I

=== Programs Incorporating Genmab’s Innovation and Technology ===
==== Approved Medicines/Products ====
Approved Product	Target	Discovered and/or Developed & Marketed By	Disease indications	Approval Year	Royalties
DARZALEX (iv) (daratumumab) and DARZALEX FASPRO (subcu.) (daratumumab and hyaluronidase)	CD38	Janssen	Multiple myeloma (MM)	2015 (iv), 2020 (sc)	0-$3bn tiered: 14.92% (avg.), >$3bn fixed: 20%
DARZALEX FASPRO	CD38	Janssen	AL Amyloidosis	2021	As for MM
Kesimpta (ofatumumab)	CD20	Novartis	Relapsing remitting multiple sclerosis (RRMS)	2020	10%
TEPEZZA (teprotumumab)	IGF-1R	Amgen (under sublicense from Roche)	Thyroid eye disease (TED)	2020	6% (Jan Van de Winkel)
RYBREVANT (amivantamab)	EGFR, cMet	Janssen	NSCLC	2021	8-10%
TECVAYLI (teclistamab)	BCMA, CD3	Janssen	Relapsed/refractory MM (RRMM)	2022	~5-6%
TALVEY (talquetamab)	GPRC5D, CD3	Janssen	RRMM	2023	~5-6%

==== Pipeline, Partner-owned products incorporating Genmab’s innovation, ≥Phase 2 Development ====
Product	Target	Discovered and/or Developed & Marketed By	Disease indications	Most Advanced Development Phase	Royalties
Amivantamab	EGFR, cMet	Janssen	Advanced or Metastatic Gastric or Esophageal cancer	II	8-10%
Amivantamab	"	"	Hepatocellular carcinoma	II	"
Amivantamab	"	"	Advanced or metastatic colorectal cancer	I/II	"
Inclacumab	selectin P	Pfizer	VOC in Sickle cell disease	III; Est. prim. completion 2023-12	5-6% (Jan Van de Winkel: "mid single-digit")
Mim8 (Factor VIII mimetic bispecific antibody)	FIXa, FX	Novo Nordisk	Haemophilia A	III; Est. prim. completion 2024-05	5-6% (Jan Van de Winkel: "mid single-digit")
Camidanlumab tesirine (ADCT-301)	CD25	ADC Therapeutics	Relapsed/refractory HL	II; 2022-11: FDA has advised ADCT that an ongoing ph3 study - preferably with full enrollment - is needed to support a BLA submission. ADCT therefore plans to conduct a ph3 study for which full enrollment is estimated to take 2 years.	5-9% tiered (GMAB: "mid-to-high single-digit tiered")
Ordesekimab	IL-15	Sanofi	Gluten-free diet non-responsive Celiac disease	II	-
Lu AF82422	Alpha-Synuclein	Lundbeck	Multiple system atrophy (MSA)	II	-
