= Class C GPCR =

G-protein coupled receptor

7 transmembrane receptor (metabotropic glutamate family)

Identifiers
- Symbol: 7tm_3
- Pfam: PF00003
- InterPro: IPR000337
- PROSITE: PDOC00754
- TCDB: 9.A.14
- OPM superfamily: 6
- OPM protein: 4or2
- CDD: cd13953
Available protein structures:
- PDB: IPR000337 PF00003 (ECOD; PDBsum)
- AlphaFold: IPR000337; PF00003

The class C G-protein-coupled receptors (InterPro: IPR000337) are a class of G-protein coupled receptors that include the metabotropic glutamate receptors (InterPro: IPR000162) and several additional receptors.

Structurally they are composed of four elements; an N-terminal signal sequence; a large hydrophilic extracellular agonist-binding region containing several conserved cysteine residues which could be involved in disulphide bonds; a shorter region containing seven transmembrane domains; and a C-terminal cytoplasmic domain of variable length. This protein family includes metabotropic glutamate receptors, the extracellular calcium-sensing receptors, the gamma-amino-butyric acid (GABA) type B receptors, and the vomeronasal type-2 receptors.

== Subfamilies ==
=== Calcium-sensing receptor-related ===
- extracellular calcium-sensing receptor-related InterPro: IPR000068
  - Calcium-sensing receptor (CASR)
  - GPRC6A (GPRC6A)

=== GABA_{B} receptors ===
- GABA_{B} receptor (gamma-aminobutyric acid) InterPro: IPR002455
  - GABA_{B} receptor 1 (GABBR1)
  - GABA_{B} receptor 2 (GABBR2)

=== Metabotropic glutamate receptors ===
- Metabotropic glutamate receptors (mGluR) InterPro: IPR000162
  - mGluR_{1} (GRM1)
  - mGluR_{2} (GRM2)
  - mGluR_{3} (GRM3)
  - mGluR_{4} (GRM4)
  - mGluR_{5} (GRM5)
  - mGluR_{6} (GRM6)
  - mGluR_{7} (GRM7)
  - mGluR_{8} (GRM8)

=== RAIG ===
- Retinoic acid-inducible orphan G protein-coupled receptors (RAIG)
  - RAIG_{1} (GPRC5A)
  - RAIG_{2} (GPRC5B)
  - RAIG_{3} (GPRC5C)
  - RAIG_{4} (GPRC5D)

=== Taste receptors ===
- Taste receptor
  - Taste receptor, type 1, member 1 (TAS1R1)
  - Taste receptor, type 1, member 2 (TAS1R2)
  - Taste receptor, type 1, member 3 (TAS1R3)

=== Orphan ===
- Class C Orphan receptors
  - GPR158 (GPR158)
  - GPR179 (GPR179)
  - GPR156 (GPR156)

=== Other ===
- Bride of sevenless protein InterPro: IPR002956
- Vomeronasal receptor, type 2 InterPro: IPR004073
