= Donald L. Drakeman =

American businessman and academic

Donald Lee Drakeman is an American entrepreneur, venture capitalist, business executive, academic, and scholar based in South Carolina.

He has since 2007 been a venture partner in Advent Venture Partners, a venture capital firm based in London, in connection with which he is a member of the firm's life sciences Team. At the same time he is a Distinguished Research Professor in the Center for Citizenship and Constitutional Government at the University of Notre Dame as well as a Fellow in Health Management of the Judge Business School at Cambridge University, where he is a member of the Operations and Technology Management Subject Group and associated with the Cambridge Centre for Health Leadership & Enterprise. He is in addition the Chairman of the advisory council of the James Madison Program in American Ideals and Institutions at Princeton University, where he was for many years a member of the faculty and taught lecture courses and seminars on civil liberties and the United States Constitution.

His book Church, State, and Original Intent, which concerns the Establishment Clause of the First Amendment to the United States Constitution, was published by Cambridge University Press in 2010. In 2015 Palgrave Macmillan published Why We Need the Humanities, which focuses on the relation of the humanities to the life sciences and to civil liberties. In 2021 Cambridge University Press published The Hollow Core of Constitutional Theory: Why We Need the Framers, which defends the idea that the intentions of the Framers ought to have a central role in constitutional interpretation. He is also one of the authors of From Breakthrough to Blockbuster: The Business of Biotechnology, which was published in 2022 by Oxford University Press.

He was educated at Dartmouth College (AB magna cum laude), Columbia Law School (JD Harlan Fiske Stone Scholar), and Princeton University (MA, PhD in Religion).

A resident of Montclair, New Jersey, he was appointed in 1994 as chair of the township's zoning board of adjustment.

In the early stages of his career he worked as an attorney at Milbank, Tweed, Hadley & McCloy and was the vice-president of the Essex Chemical Corporation. He is best known as the co-founder of two biotechnology companies, Medarex Inc. and Genmab A/S, both of which develop drugs used in monoclonal antibody therapy. During his tenure as the founding CEO of Medarex, the company raised more than a billion dollars, entered into alliances with many other pharmaceutical companies, and spun off Genmab, which subsequently completed the largest biotechnology IPO in the history of European capital markets up to the time of the offering. He was an Ernst & Young Entrepreneur of the Year in 2005.

He serves as a Trustee of Drew University, a Visitor of Ralston College, a member of the Board of Advisors of the Rutgers Business School, and formerly served as a Trustee of the Woodrow Wilson National Fellowship Foundation and of the University of Charleston. He is also a member of the editorial board of the journal mAbs. He was formerly the Chairman of the New Jersey Commission on Science and Technology, and has served on the boards of several companies, including Oxford Glycosciences, IDM-Pharma, and Mannkind. He continues to be a Director of Zymeworks Inc. He is in addition a Fellow of the Royal Society of Biology, the Royal Historical Society, and of the Burgon Society.
