= James Madison Program in American Ideals and Institutions =

Princeton University political organization

Coordinates: 40°20′56.3″N 74°38′58.2″W

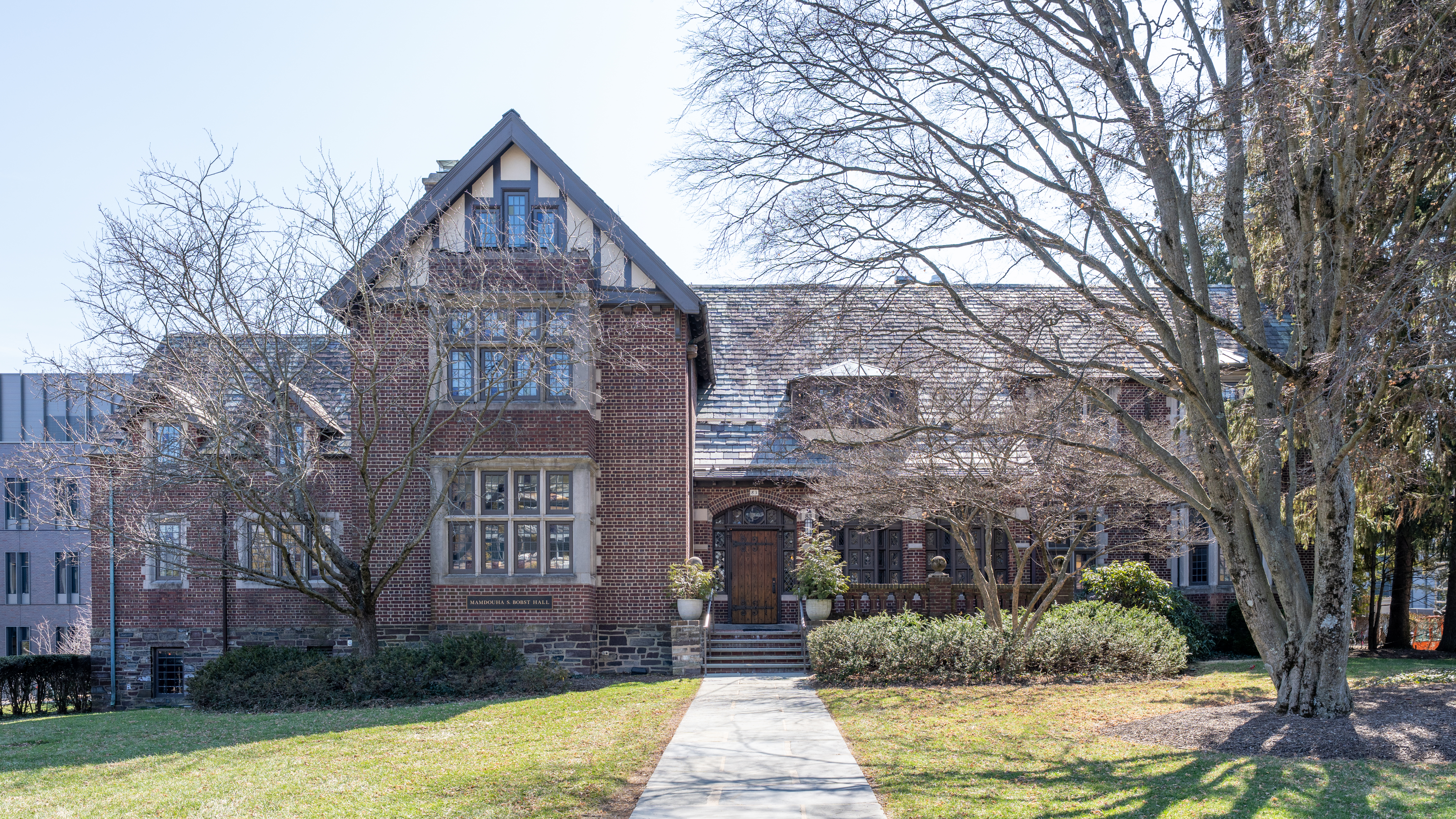
- Bobst Hall, Home of the James Madison Program
- Abbreviation: JMP
- Named after: James Madison
- Formation: 2000
- Type: Academic Program
- Headquarters: Bobst Hall, Princeton University
- Location: 83 Prospect Ave., Princeton, New Jersey
- Director: Robert P. George
- Executive Director: Bradford P. Wilson
- Website: https://jmp.princeton.edu

The James Madison Program in American Ideals and Institutions, often called simply the James Madison Program (abbreviated JMP) or the Madison Program, is a scholarly institute within the Department of Politics at Princeton University "dedicated to exploring enduring questions of American constitutional law and Western political thought." The Madison Program was founded in 2000 and is directed by Robert P. George, the McCormick Professor of Jurisprudence at Princeton University.

== History ==
The Madison Program was founded in the summer of 2000 via a charter with the Department of Politics at Princeton University. Early funders included Steve Forbes, the John M. Olin Foundation, and the Bradley Foundation. Early speakers included liberal scholars James E. Fleming of Fordham University and Stanley N. Katz of Princeton University, and conservative ones, including Robert Bork; Christopher DeMuth, then-president of the American Enterprise Institute; Lynne Cheney, chairwoman of the National Endowment for the Humanities in the first Bush administration; and William Kristol, then-editor of The Weekly Standard.

The Program celebrated its 10th anniversary in 2010 with a lecture from columnist George Will. Summer 2020 marked the 20th anniversary of the Program.

== Academic programs ==
=== Politics departmental track ===
The Program sponsors the track in "American Ideas and Institutions" for undergraduates concentrating in Politics at Princeton. The track includes courses from American politics, political theory, and public law to allow students to "further and demonstrate their understandings of the three branches of the federal government and the values, ideas, and theories that underlie them and are animated by their workings."

=== Undergraduate Fellows Forum ===
The Program is host to the Undergraduate Fellows Forum, a program for Princeton undergraduates to engage with fellow students on American political institutions and constitutionalism. Undergraduate Fellows have included conservative as well as some liberal and socialist students, and founded such programs at Princeton as a podcast called "Woke Wednesdays" and the third undergraduate chapter of the Federalist Society.

=== James Madison Society ===
The Madison Program is host to several Visiting and Postdoctoral Fellows at Princeton every year and past Visiting Fellows become part of the James Madison Society. It consists predominantly of conservative academics, but also includes some liberal and socialist public figures.

Notable members of the James Madison Society

Name	Institution
John Agresto	St. John's College
William B. Allen	Michigan State University
Hadley P. Arkes	Amherst College
Stephen Balch	Texas Tech University
Mark Bauerlein	Emory University
Francis J. Beckwith	Baylor University
Paul O. Carrese	Arizona State University
Angelo Codevilla (d. 2021)	Boston University
David G. Dalin	Brandeis University
Patrick Deneen	University of Notre Dame
John J. DiIulio Jr.	University of Pennsylvania
Donald L. Drakeman	University of Notre Dame
Daniel Dreisbach	American University
Jean Bethke Elshtain (d. 2013)	University of Chicago
John Finnis	University of Notre Dame; University of Oxford
Michael Gerhardt	University of North Carolina
Mary Ann Glendon	Harvard University
Jack Goldsmith	Harvard University
Christopher R. Green	University of Mississippi
Allen C. Guelzo	Gettysburg College
Philip Hamburger	Columbia University
Anne Hendershott	Franciscan University of Steubenville
Matthew S. Holland	Utah Valley University
Leon Kass	University of Chicago; American Enterprise Institute
Charles R. Kesler	Claremont McKenna College
Harvey Klehr	Emory University
Robert C. Koons	University of Texas at Austin
Alan Charles Kors	University of Pennsylvania
Michael I. Krauss	George Mason University
Peter Lawler (d. 2017)	Berry College
Yuval Levin	Ethics and Public Policy Center; National Affairs
Joyce Lee Malcolm	George Mason University
Harvey Mansfield	Harvard University
Wilfred M. McClay	Hillsdale College
Lawrence Mead	New York University
Kenneth P. Miller	Claremont McKenna College
Vincent Phillip Muñoz	University of Notre Dame
Michael New	Catholic University of America
David Novak	University of Toronto
Marvin Olasky	Patrick Henry College
Daniel N. Robinson (d. 2018)	Georgetown University; University of Oxford
Charles T. Rubin	Duquesne University
Diana Schaub	Loyola University Maryland
Gabriel Schoenfeld	Hudson Institute
Roger Scruton (d. 2020)	Oxford University; Ethics and Public Policy Center
James Reist Stoner Jr.	Louisiana State University
Carol M. Swain	Vanderbilt University (retired)
Carl Trueman	Grove City College
Michael Uhlmann	Claremont Graduate University
Bradley C.S. Watson	Saint Vincent College
Cornel West	Harvard University; Princeton University
Thomas G. West	Hillsdale College
W. Bradford Wilcox	University of Virginia
James Q. Wilson (d. 2012)	Harvard University; Princeton University
Michael Zuckert	University of Notre Dame

== Reception ==
=== Conservatism ===
In 2006, Max Blumenthal wrote in The Nation that the Madison Program is not like the Center for Human Values at Princeton or the Remarque Institute at New York University, but rather serves as "a vehicle for conservative interests." Blumenthal writes that the Madison Program uses "funding from a shadowy, cultlike Catholic group and right-wing foundations" to support right-wing politics at Princeton University, even becoming "the blueprint for the right's strategy to extend and consolidate power within the university system." Similar institutions at Georgetown University, New York University, and Williams College have used the Madison Program as a template for their operations. In 2017, the North Carolina–based think tank NC Policy Watch reported that the James Madison Program is funded and operated by conservative philanthropists and academics to promote conservatism in higher education, and that the University of North Carolina Board of Governors considered the Madison Program a "model."

In 2016, Jane Mayer wrote for The Chronicle of Higher Education noting that the Madison Program was founded with funds from the conservative John M. Olin Foundation and that the program's founding serves as part of a broader strategy for conservative billionaires to infiltrate higher education in the United States. Her piece was cited by Greenpeace as demonstrative of dark money being used to deceptively promote conservative perspectives and downplay the fossil fuel industry's role in climate change.

In 2019, journalist Emma Green wrote in The Atlantic that the James Madison Program serves as a conservative hub for right-wing students and academics within the "largely apolitical or vaguely liberal" politics of the Princeton University community.

In 2023, Jewish Currents writers Dahlia Krutkovich and Sarah Rosen noted that the James Madison Program "is known for bringing right-wing figures to campus" and criticized its invitation of Ronen Shoval, who founded the ultranationalist Im Tirtzu, which has been described as being involved in campaigns against political progressives, academics, and anti-Zionists and having similarities to fascist groups. Krutkovich and Rosen also criticized the arrival of Shoval due to his fabrication of his academic background and his calls to curtail academic freedom and freedom of speech in Israel. Princeton University students and others in the Jewish community protested Shoval's arrival as well as the 2023 Israeli judicial reforms at the Center for Jewish Life on campus.

Student publications at Princeton University such as The Daily Princetonian, Nassau Weekly, and The Princeton Progressive have described the James Madison Program as a conservative institute that "exists to further conservative viewpoints on campus" and where "Princeton's conservatives can receive cues about the status of their movement." Similarly to other journalistic outlets, student journalists have pointed to its predominantly conservative donors and fellows, and platforming of "far-right and extremist individuals." However, The Princeton Tory has claimed that the program "promotes political discussion and scholarship without favoring any political ideology."

Director Robert P. George claims the Program is not conservative, but rather "seeks to bring competing points of view together to lift the intellectual debate on campus."

=== Religion ===
In the 2007 book Faith in the Halls of Power, D. Michael Lindsay praised the Madison Program for enabling cooperation between Catholic and Evangelical Christians.

=== Engaging with opposing views ===
On March 14, 2017, Robert P. George and Cornel West issued a joint statement via the Madison Program to encourage citizens to engage with people of opposing views. The statement was opened to signatories from the public; as of March 2019, there were more than 4,000 signatories. Outlets noted its significance due to the juxtaposition of George's Christian conservative views with West's democratic socialist and radical democratic views.
