= Mir-103/107 microRNA precursor =

mir-103/107 microRNA precursor
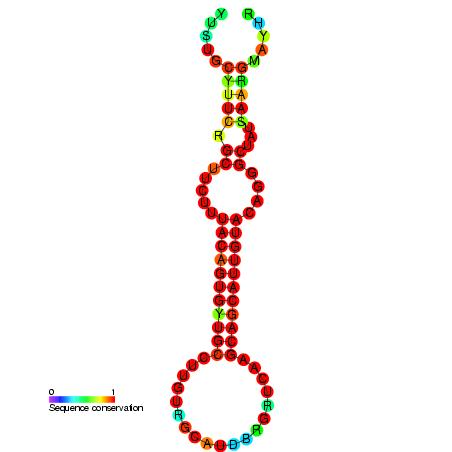
- Predicted secondary structure and sequence conservation of mir-103

Identifiers
- Symbol: mir-103
- Rfam: RF00129
- miRBase: MI0000109
- miRBase family: MIPF0000024

Other data
- RNA type: Gene; miRNA
- Domain: Eukaryota
- GO: GO:0035195 GO:0035068
- SO: SO:0001244
- PDB structures: PDBe

The miR-103 microRNA precursor (homologous to miR-107), is a short non-coding RNA gene involved in gene regulation. miR-103 and miR-107 have now been predicted or experimentally confirmed in human.

microRNAs are transcribed as ~70 nucleotide precursors and subsequently processed by the Dicer enzyme to give a ~22 nucleotide product. In this case the mature sequence comes from the 5' arm of the precursor. The mature products are thought to have regulatory roles through complementarity to mRNA.

mir-103 and mir-107 were noted as being upregulated in obese mice and were subsequently found to have a key role in insulin sensitivity. This led to a suggestion that these microRNAs represent potential targets for the treatment of type 2 diabetes.

mir-103 has also been linked with chronic pain and intestinal cell proliferation.

Recently, miR-103-3p was shown to target the 5' untranslated region (5' UTR) of GPRC5A's mRNA in pancreatic cancer. This is one of only a handful of known instances where a miRNA targets the 5' UTR of a mRNA.
