= RGS7 =

Protein found in humans

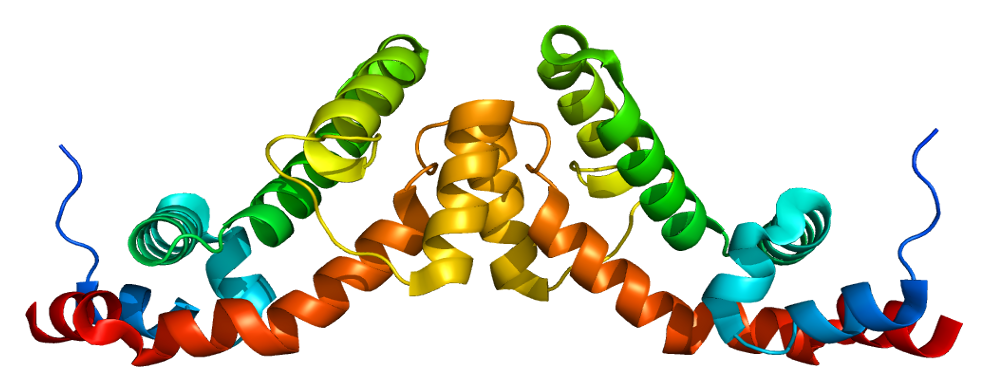

Identifiers
- Aliases: RGS7, regulator of G protein signaling 7
- External IDs: OMIM: 602517; MGI: 1346089; GeneCards: RGS7
Available structures
PDB	Ortholog search: PDBe RCSB
PDB	List of PDB id codes 2A72, 2D9J

Gene location (Human)
Chr.	Chromosome 1 (human)
Band	1q43|1q23.1	Start	240,767,636 bp
Band	1q43|1q23.1	End	241,357,374 bp

Gene location (Mouse)
Chr.	Chromosome 1 (mouse)
Band	1 H3|1 81.11 cM	Start	174,886,653 bp
Band	1 H3|1 81.11 cM	End	175,320,066 bp
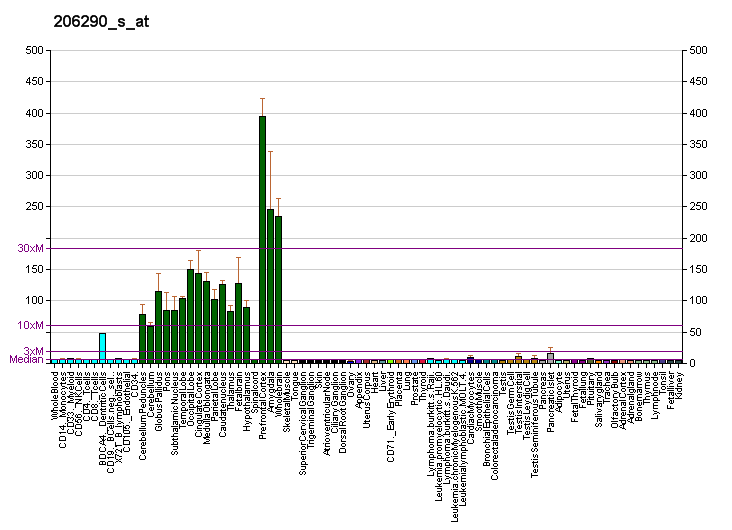
RNA expression pattern
Bgee	Human / Mouse (ortholog); Top expressed in: endothelial cell; Brodmann area 23; middle temporal gyrus; frontal pole; Region I of hippocampus proper; orbitofrontal cortex; Brodmann area 46; Brodmann area 10; primary visual cortex; paraflocculus of cerebellum / Top expressed in: facial motor nucleus; primary visual cortex; dentate gyrus of hippocampal formation granule cell; Cortex of frontal lobe; superior frontal gyrus; prefrontal cortex; temporal lobe; primary motor cortex; cingulate gyrus; amygdala; More reference expression data
BioGPS	More reference expression data
Gene ontology
Molecular function	G-protein beta-subunit binding; GTPase activator activity; GTPase activity
Cellular component	cytosol; membrane; cytoplasm; plasma membrane; heterotrimeric G-protein complex
Biological process	G protein-coupled receptor signaling pathway; positive regulation of GTPase activity; negative regulation of signal transduction; intracellular signal transduction; protein folding
Sources:Amigo / QuickGO
Orthologs
Databases	NCBI: entry; OMA: entry
Species	Human	Mouse
Entrez	6000	24012
Ensembl	ENSG00000182901	ENSMUSG00000026527
UniProt	P49802	O54829
RefSeq (mRNA)	NM_001282773; NM_001282775; NM_001282778; NM_002924; NM_001350113 NM_001350114; NM_001350115; NM_001350116; NM_001364886; NM_001374806; NM_001374807; NM_001374808; NM_001374809; NM_001374810; NM_001374811; NM_001374812; NM_001374813; NM_001374814; NM_001374815; NM_001374816	NM_001199003; NM_011880; NM_001347195; NM_001357129
RefSeq (protein)	NP_001269702; NP_001269704; NP_001269707; NP_002915; NP_001337042 NP_001337043; NP_001337044; NP_001337045; NP_001351815; NP_001361735; NP_001361736; NP_001361737; NP_001361738; NP_001361739; NP_001361740; NP_001361741; NP_001361742; NP_001361743; NP_001361744; NP_001361745	NP_001185932; NP_001334124; NP_036010; NP_001344058
Location (UCSC)	Chr 1: 240.77 – 241.36 Mb	Chr 1: 174.89 – 175.32 Mb
PubMed search
- Wikidata
View/Edit Human	View/Edit Mouse

Regulator of G-protein signaling 7 is a protein that in humans is encoded by the RGS7 gene.

RGS7 is highly enriched in the brain where it acts as a universal inhibitor of Gi/o-coupled GPCR. RGS7 is a GTPase-activating protein (GAP). It accelerates the GTP hydrolysis on G proteins determining their fast inactivation and acting as intracellular antagonists of GPCR signaling.

== Interactions ==
RGS7 has been shown to interact with:

- GNB5,
- GPR158,
- GPR179,
- PKD1, and
- SNAPAP.
