= GPR156 =

Protein-coding gene in the species Homo sapiens

Identifiers
- Aliases: GPR156, GABABL, PGR28, G protein-coupled receptor 156
- External IDs: OMIM: 610464; MGI: 2653880; GeneCards: GPR156

Gene location (Human)
Chr.	Chromosome 3 (human)
Band	3q13.33	Start	120,164,645 bp
Band	3q13.33	End	120,285,222 bp

Gene location (Mouse)
Chr.	Chromosome 16 (mouse)
Band	16|16 B3	Start	37,736,858 bp
Band	16|16 B3	End	37,827,892 bp
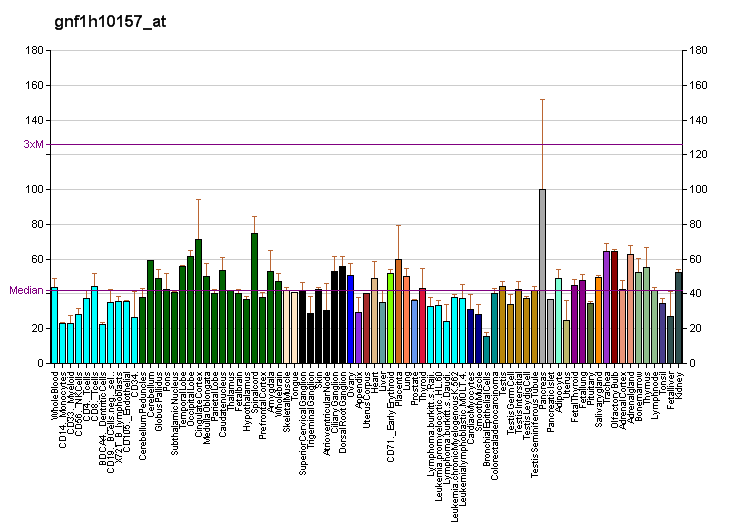

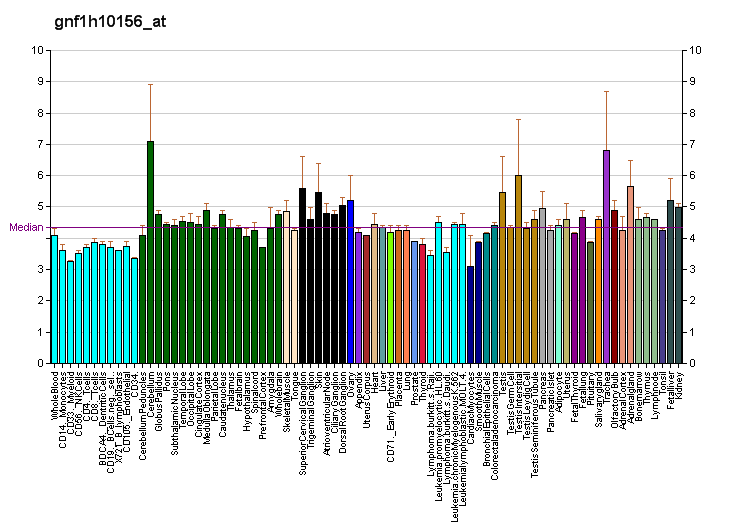
RNA expression pattern
Bgee	Human / Mouse (ortholog); Top expressed in: ventricular zone; ganglionic eminence; testicle; gonad; secondary oocyte; muscle tissue; right testis; left testis; urinary bladder; occipital lobe / Top expressed in: ventricular zone; neural tube; mesencephalon; ganglionic eminence; white adipose tissue; rhombencephalon; conceptus; placenta; spermatid; neural layer of retina; More reference expression data
BioGPS	More reference expression data
Gene ontology
Molecular function	G protein-coupled receptor activity; G protein-coupled GABA receptor activity; signal transducer activity
Cellular component	integral component of membrane; membrane; plasma membrane; G protein-coupled receptor heterodimeric complex
Biological process	G protein-coupled receptor signaling pathway; signal transduction; gamma-aminobutyric acid signaling pathway
Sources:Amigo / QuickGO
Orthologs
Databases	NCBI: entry; OMA: entry
Species	Human	Mouse
Entrez	165829	239845
Ensembl	ENSG00000175697	ENSMUSG00000046961
UniProt	Q8NFN8	Q6PCP7
RefSeq (mRNA)	NM_001168271; NM_153002	NM_153394
RefSeq (protein)	NP_001161743; NP_694547	NP_700443
Location (UCSC)	Chr 3: 120.16 – 120.29 Mb	Chr 16: 37.74 – 37.83 Mb
PubMed search
- Wikidata
View/Edit Human	View/Edit Mouse

GPR156 (G protein-coupled receptor 156), is a human gene which encodes a G protein-coupled receptor belonging to metabotropic glutamate receptor subfamily. By sequence homology, this gene was proposed as being a possible GABA_{B} receptor subunit; however, when expressed in cells alone or with other GABA_{B} subunits, no response to GABA_{B} ligands could be detected. In vitro studies on GPR156 constitutive activity revealed a high level of basal activation and coupling with members of the Gi/Go heterotrimeric G protein family. In 2021, an article was reported that GPR156 modulates hair cell orientation in the cochlea. Also, it was proposed that GPR156 is related to congenital hearing loss. GPR156 in complex with any of the Gi/o heterotrimers regulates the hair cell orientation. In 2024, molecular structures of G-free and Go-bound GPR156 were characterized by using cryogenic electron microscopy.

== Structure ==
Among class C GPCR family members, GPR156 is unique because it lacks a large extracellular domain. Structural analyses revealed that the asymmetric binding of Go-protein to GPR156 triggers conformational change of its cytoplasmic face without altering dimer interface. Although the inactive class C GPCRs undergo rearrangement of their dimeric interface, the agonist- and/or the positive allosteric modulator-bound class C GPCRs retain their dimeric interface upon G-protein binding. Thus, the G-free GPR156 is likely to represent an active state. Structural and functional analyses suggest that abundant endogenous phospholipids, receptor dimerization, and the G-protein binding-induced conformational change of the cytoplasmic face are the primary reasons for constitutive activation of GPR156. Phosphatidylglycerol further stimulates the activity of GPR156, which suggests the environmental changes of the phospholipid composition may regulate the GPR156 activity.

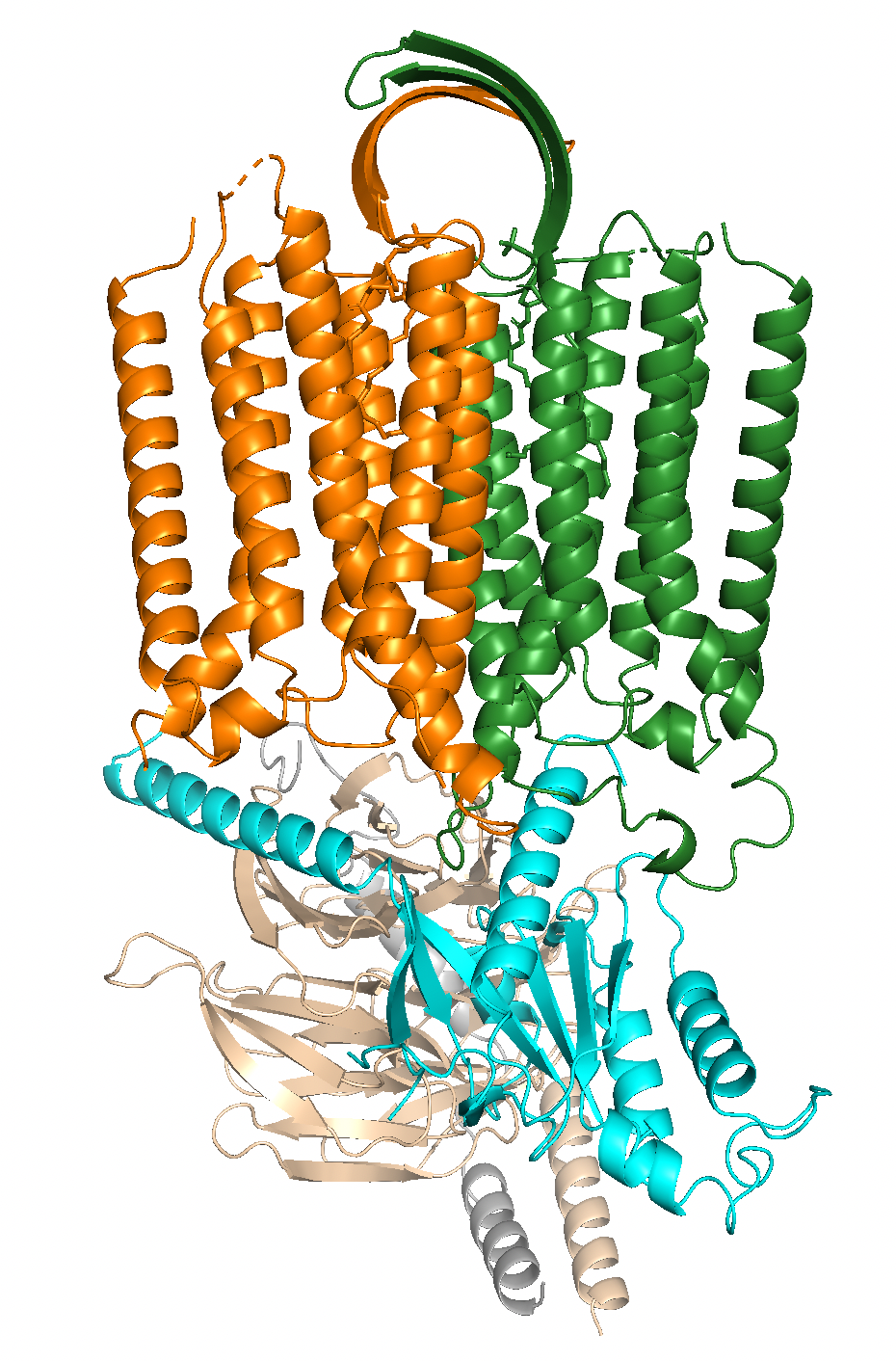
G-bound GPR156 (PDB: 8IED)

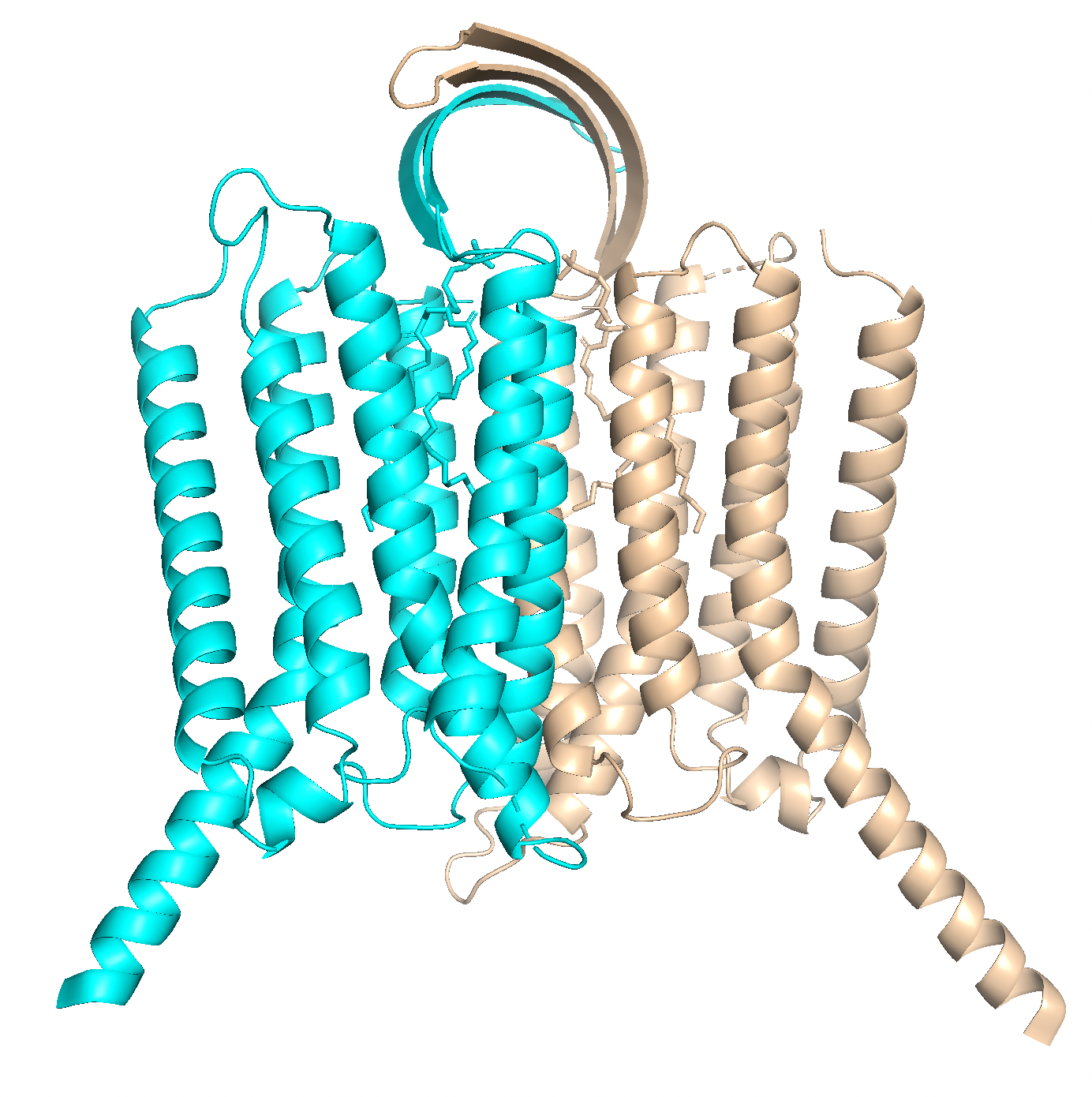
G-free GPR156 (PDB: 8IEI)
