= GPR158 =

Protein-coding gene in the species Homo sapiens

Identifiers
- Aliases: GPR158, G protein-coupled receptor 158
- External IDs: OMIM: 614573; MGI: 2441697; GeneCards: GPR158

Gene location (Human)
Chr.	Chromosome 10 (human)
Band	10p12.1	Start	25,174,802 bp
Band	10p12.1	End	25,602,229 bp

Gene location (Mouse)
Chr.	Chromosome 2 (mouse)
Band	2|2 A3	Start	21,372,353 bp
Band	2|2 A3	End	21,835,358 bp
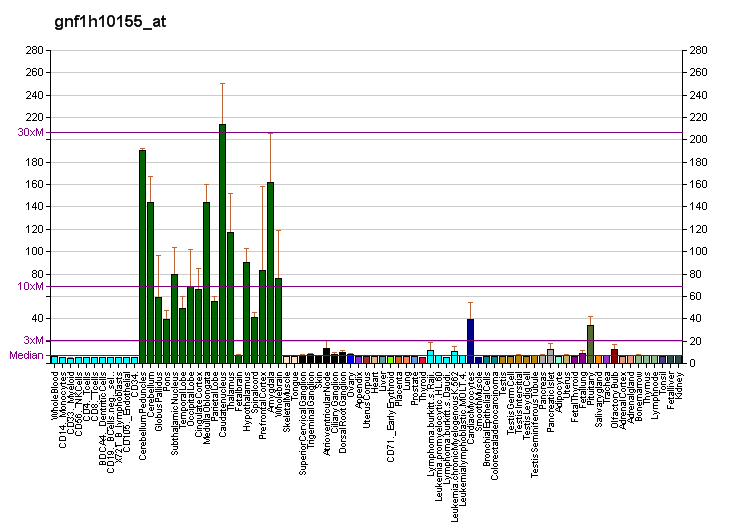
RNA expression pattern
Bgee	Human / Mouse (ortholog); Top expressed in: endothelial cell; middle temporal gyrus; cerebellar vermis; Brodmann area 23; lateral nuclear group of thalamus; Brodmann area 46; pons; superior frontal gyrus; postcentral gyrus; primary visual cortex / Top expressed in: superior frontal gyrus; primary visual cortex; dentate gyrus of hippocampal formation granule cell; cerebellar cortex; secondary oocyte; supraoptic nucleus; lumbar subsegment of spinal cord; neural layer of retina; CA3 field; lumbar spinal ganglion; More reference expression data
BioGPS	More reference expression data
Gene ontology
Molecular function	G protein-coupled receptor activity; signal transducer activity
Cellular component	integral component of membrane; plasma membrane; membrane
Biological process	G protein-coupled receptor signaling pathway; protein localization to plasma membrane; signal transduction
Sources:Amigo / QuickGO
Orthologs
Databases	NCBI: entry; OMA: entry
Species	Human	Mouse
Entrez	57512	241263
Ensembl	ENSG00000151025	ENSMUSG00000045967
UniProt	Q5T848	Q8C419
RefSeq (mRNA)	NM_020752	NM_001004761; NM_175706
RefSeq (protein)	NP_065803	NP_001004761
Location (UCSC)	Chr 10: 25.17 – 25.6 Mb	Chr 2: 21.37 – 21.84 Mb
PubMed search
- Wikidata
View/Edit Human	View/Edit Mouse

Probable G-protein coupled receptor 158 (GPR158), also known as the metabotropic glycine receptor (mGlyR), is a protein that in humans is encoded by the GPR158 gene.

== Function ==
This protein is an orphan class C GPCR. It is highly expressed in the brain, where it binds to RGS7, an inhibitor of G_{i/o}-coupled GPCR signaling, localizing it to the plasma membrane.

It is expressed at lower levels in other organs and shows an unusual subcellular localization pattern, being found at both the plasma membrane and in the nucleus.

== Clinical significance ==
=== Role in mood regulation ===
GPR158 in the medial prefrontal cortex (mPFC) has been shown to regulate stress-induced depression in a mouse model of depression and has been found to be upregulated in post-mortem tissue samples from humans with major depressive disorder (MDD).

=== Role in prostate cancer ===
The GPR158 gene is an androgen-regulated gene that stimulates cell proliferation in prostate cancer cell lines, and it is linked to neuroendocrine differentiation.
