= Medarex =

American biopharmaceutical company

- Company type: Public
- Traded as: Nasdaq: MEDX
- Industry: Biopharmaceutical
- Founded: 1987; 38 years ago
- Founder: Dr. Michael W. Fanger; Dr. Paul M. Guyre; Dr. Edward D. Ball
- Defunct: 2009; 16 years ago
- Fate: Acquired by Bristol Myers Squibb
- Headquarters: Princeton, New Jersey, U.S.
- Parent: Bristol Myers Squibb

Medarex was an American biopharmaceutical company based in Princeton, New Jersey, with manufacturing facilities in Bloomsbury and Annandale, New Jersey, and research facilities in Milpitas and Sunnyvale, California. In 2009, Medarex was purchased by Bristol Myers Squibb.

Medarex developed monoclonal antibodies to CTLA-4 and PD-1, which are proteins on the surface of T cells. T cells attack cancer cells, but CTLA-4 and PD-1 act as "brakes" on the T cell's anti-cancer activities. The monoclonal antibodies bind to these proteins and block them, releasing the T cell to attack cancer cells.

Several monoclonal antibodies developed by Medarex have been approved for disease therapy. In 2009, the U.S. Food and Drug Administration approved Simponi, a human monoclonal antibody to tumor necrosis factor alpha co-developed with Johnson & Johnson's Janssen Biotech, for treatment of arthritis. In 2011, the U.S. FDA approved ipilimumab, a monoclonal antibody to CTLA-4, for treatment of metastatic melanoma. In 2014, the U.S. FDA approved nivolumab, a monoclonal antibody to PD-1, for treatment of advanced melanoma. Its use was expanded to the treatment of squamous non-small-cell lung carcinoma in 2015.

Medarex developed some of the first transgenic mice with humanized immune systems, in order to generate fully human antibodies. Many of the on-market monoclonal antibodies have been derived from this platform.

== History ==
Medarex was founded in 1987 by a group of immunologists at Dartmouth Medical School—Dr. Michael W. Fanger, Dr. Paul M. Guyre, and Dr. Edward D. Ball — who partnered with Donald L. Drakeman and Charles Schaller of Essex Chemical Company, through its venture capital arm Essex Vencap.

Drakeman, a Dartmouth graduate, brought the parties together and served as the company's chief executive officer. The company went public in 1991, with 2,300,000 shares of common stock at $6.10 per share and 2,250,000 Redeemable Warrants offered at its IPO. The company's second president and CEO was Howard H. Pien, succeeding Drakeman in 2007. Genmab was founded as a European spin-off of American Biotech company Medarex in February 1999.

The company was acquired by Bristol Myers Squibb in 2009 for $2.4 billion, which included $300 million in debt, making the payment to Medarex $2.1 billion.
