= Francis J. Beckwith =

American philosopher and academic (born 1960)

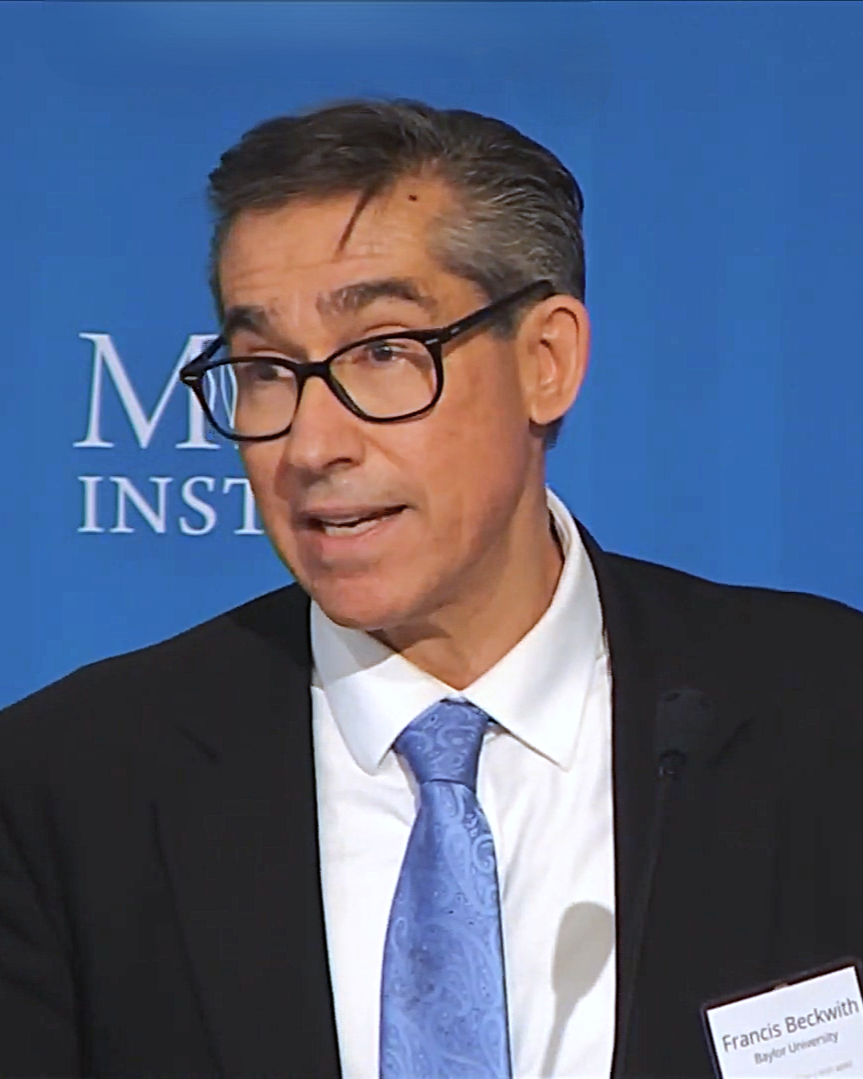
- Beckwith in 2021
- Born: Francis Joseph Beckwith; November 3, 1960 (age 66); New York City, U.S.

Education
- Education: University of Nevada, Las Vegas (BA); Simon Greenleaf University (MA); Fordham University (MA, PhD); Washington University in St. Louis (MJS)
- Thesis: David Hume's Argument Against Miracles: Contemporary Attempts to Rehabilitate It and a Response (1989)

Philosophical work
- Institutions: Baylor University
- Main interests: Christian philosophy, Christian apologetics, ethics, applied ethics, legal philosophy

Francis Joseph Beckwith (born November 3, 1960) is an American philosopher and academic. He is a professor of philosophy and church-state studies at Baylor University, where he was the associate director of the J. M. Dawson Institute of Church-State Studies.

== Early life and education ==
Francis Joseph Beckwith was born on November 3, 1960, in New York City. He is currently professor of philosophy and church-state studies, affiliate professor of political science and associate director of the Graduate Program in Philosophy, at Baylor University, where he first served as associate director of Baylor's J. M. Dawson Institute of Church-State Studies.

After high school, Beckwith graduated from the University of Nevada, Las Vegas, with a Bachelor of Arts in philosophy in 1983. He then earned a Master of Arts in apologetics from Simon Greenleaf University (now Trinity International University). Afterwards, he earned an M.A. in philosophy from Fordham University in 1984. He wrote his master's thesis at Fordham on the Baháʼí Faith.

In 1989, he earned his Ph.D. in philosophy from Fordham University. In 2001, he earned a Master of Juridical Studies (M.J.S.) from the Washington University School of Law. He wrote his legal dissertation on the inclusion of intelligent design in public school science curricula. In 2003, Rowman and Littlefield published his dissertation in revised and expanded form as Law, Darwinism, and Public Education: The Establishment Clause and the Challenge of Intelligent Design.

== Academic career ==
Prior to arriving at Baylor in July 2003, he was a visiting research fellow (2002–2003) in the James Madison Program in the Politics Department at Princeton University. He has also held full-time academic appointments at UNLV (Lecturer in Philosophy, 1989–96), Whittier College (assistant professor of philosophy, 1996–97), and Trinity International University (Associate Professor Philosophy, Culture, and Law, 1997-2002). Beckwith has also held two visiting endowed appointments: (2008–2009) Mary Anne Remick Senior Visiting Fellow in the de Nicola Center for Ethics & Culture at the University of Notre Dame, and (2016–2017) Visiting Scholar in Conservative Thought and Policy in the Benson Center for Western Civilization, Thought, and Policy at the University of Colorado, Boulder.

In November 2006, Beckwith became the 58th president of the Evangelical Theological Society (ETS), only to resign both his presidency and membership in May 2007, a week after he returned to the Catholic Church. Over a decade later, he became the 90th president of the American Catholic Philosophical Association (ACPA). From 1995 to 2007, he was a fellow at The Center for Bioethics & Human Dignity.

In 2003, after his appointment as associate director of the J. M. Dawson Institute of Church-State Studies at Baylor, 29 members of the Dawson family called on Baylor University to remove Beckwith as associate director. The Dawson family members questioned the appointment, accusing Beckwith of holding church-state positions contrary to Dawson's beliefs on the separation of church and state, largely because of Beckwith's affiliation with the Discovery Institute (DI) and his work on intelligent design and public education. Beckwith argued that their concerns were not well founded and that they represented a fundamental misunderstanding of his positions. In summer 2007 Beckwith dropped his affiliation with Discovery. He has subsequently published works highly critical of intelligent design, including chapters in his award-winning 2015 book Taking Rites Seriously' and his 2019 book Never Doubt Thomas: The Catholic Aquinas as Evangelical and Protestant.

== Personal life ==
In May 2007, Beckwith returned to the Catholicism of his youth, after decades as an Evangelical Protestant. This inspired him to write a book describing his faith journey, titled Return to Rome: Confessions of an Evangelical Catholic published by Brazos Press. It is compared with Scott Hahn's Rome Sweet Home, as a significant work of Catholic Apologetics. He currently resides with his wife in Texas.

== Work ==
Beckwith works in the areas of ethics, legal and political philosophy, philosophy of religion, and church-state jurisprudence.

Beckwith is well known for his legal and philosophical work on abortion, arguing in defense of the sanctity of life in several academic publications including his 2007 book Defending Life, published by Cambridge University Press, and his 1993 book, Politically Correct Death, published by Baker Publishing Group. He has also published multiple books examining current philosophical questions regarding religion, law and politics. His 2015 book, Taking Rites Seriously: Law, Politics and the Reasonableness of Faith, (Cambridge University Press), was the winner of the prestigious American Academy of Religion's 2016 Book Award for Excellence in the Study of Religion in the category of Constructive-Reflective Studies.

== Bibliography ==
Francis J. Beckwith in libraries (WorldCat catalog)

- Baha'i [sic]: A Christian Response to Baha'ism [sic] (Bethany House, 1985).
- David Hume's Argument Against Miracles: A Critical Analysis (Lanham: University Press of America, 1989).
- The Mormon Concept of God: A Philosophical Analysis with Stephen E. Parrish (Lewiston, New York: Edwin Mellen Press, 1991).
- Politically Correct Death: Answering the Arguments for Abortion Rights (Grand Rapids: Baker, 1993).
- Are You Politically Correct?: Debating America's Cultural Standards with Michael E. Bauman, eds. (Buffalo: Prometheus, 1993).
- See the gods fall: Four Rivals to Christianity with Stephen E. Parrish, (Joplin: College Press, 1997).
- Affirmative Action: Social Justice or Reverse Discrimination? with Todd E. Jones, eds. (Amherst: Prometheus, 1997).
- Relativism: Feet Firmly Planted in Mid-Air with Gregory Koukl, (Grand Rapids: Baker, 1998).
- The Abortion Controversy 25 Years After Roe v. Wade: A Reader 2nd ed. with Louis Pojman, eds. (Belmont, CA: Wadsworth, 1998).
- The New Mormon Challenge with Carl Mosser and Paul Owen, eds. (Grand Rapids: Zondervan, 2002).
- Do the Right Thing: Readings in Applied Ethics and Social Philosophy editor, 2nd ed. (Belmont, CA: Wadsworth, 2002).
- Law, Darwinism, and Public Education: The Establishment Clause and the Challenge of Intelligent Design (Lanham: Rowman and Littlefield, 2003).
- To Everyone An Answer: A Case for the Christian Worldview with William Lane Craig and J. P. Moreland, eds. (Downers Grove: InterVarsity Press, 2004).
- Defending Life: A Moral and Legal Case Against Abortion Choice (New York: Cambridge University Press, 2007)
- Return to Rome: Confessions of an Evangelical Catholic. Grand Rapids, MI: Brazos Press, 2009
- Politics for Christians: Statecraft as Soulcraft (Downers Grove: IVP Academic, 2010)
- A Second Look at First Things: A Case for Conservative Politics. The Hadley Arkes Festschrift (w/ R. P. George, S. McWilliams). (South Bend, IN: St. Augustine Press, 2013)
- Taking Rites Seriously: Law, Politics, and the Reasonableness of Faith (New York: Cambridge University Press, 2015)
- Never Doubt Thomas: The Catholic Aquinas as Evangelical and Protestant (Waco, TX: Baylor University Press, 2019)
