= Ronen Shoval =

Israeli writer (born 1980)

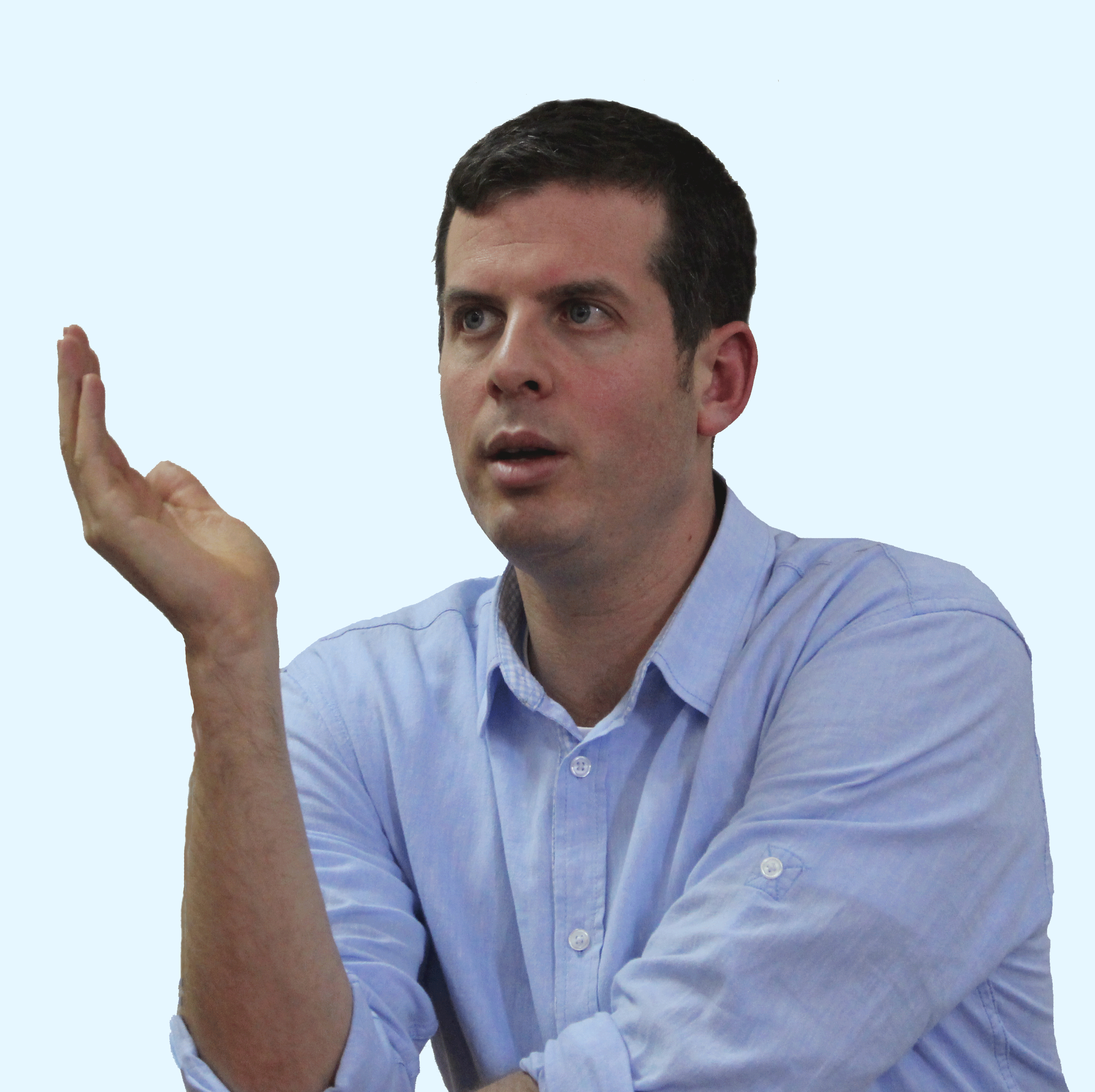
Ronen Shoval

Ronen Shoval (Hebrew: רונן שובל; born 1980 in Ramat HaSharon) is an Israeli doctor of political philosophy and author. He is head of the Argaman Institute and was dean of the Tikvah Fund. He was a visiting associate research scholar and lecturer in politics at Princeton University in the 2022–2023 academic year.

== Early life ==
Shoval was born in 1980 in Ramat Hasharon. He studied at the Open Democratic School in Jaffa, and at the Rothberg High School in Ramat Hasharon. He served in the IDF, first in the Armored Corps, and later as an operations sergeant.

Shoval earned a B.A. in international relations and an M.A. in Jewish philosophy from the Hebrew University.

He earned a PhD in Jewish political thought from the Paris West University Nanterre La Défense where he graduated summa cum laude and was mentored by sociologist Shmuel Trigano.

== Activism ==
Shoval participated in the "Young Leadership Program" of the Institute for Zionist Strategies. During the 2005 Disengagement, he and two other students founded Ta Katom (Orange Cell) which opposed the plan. He helped arrange thousands of students to protest, culminating in a 12-day hunger strike in front of the Supreme Court.

=== Im Tirzu ===
In 2006, after the Second Lebanon War, he co-founded Im Tirzu together with Erez Tadmor and served as its first chairman (2007–2013). The name means "if you will it" taken from Theodor Herzl's famous quote "if you will it, it is no dream" and focused on renewing "Zionist ideology to ensure the future of the Jewish nation and the State of Israel." It saw itself as dedicated to combating a "campaign of de-legitimization against the State of Israel and to [provide] responses to Post-Zionist and Anti-Zionist phenomena." Under Shoval, the group published a report in 2008 critiquing syllabuses used in various academic departments in Israel. In 2010 Im Tirtzu sent Ben-Gurion University of the Negev a letter demanding that the university stop what they saw as anti-Zionist bias in its Department of Politics and Government.

In 2010 Shoval published his first book, Im Tirtzu - A Manifesto for a Renewed Zionism in which he emphasized the difference between negative and positive Zionist consciousness and offered a solution to post-Zionism. It was published in English in 2013 as Herzl's Vision 2.0. Portions were included in the compilation The Zionist Ideas by Gil Troy.

Im Tirzu sued a Facebook group that compared them to fascists resulting in a lengthy court case. A Jerusalem district court ruled in 2013 that one of the Facebook posts accusing Im Tirzu of having Nazi-like racist ideology could be considered libelous but the Facebook page title stating "Im Tirzu is Fascist" did not constitute slander. The case was thrown out by the Israeli Supreme Court in 2015. Commenting on the final ruling, Shoval stated that the "Supreme Court saved the good name of the entire Zionist movement."

=== Other Public and Political Activity ===
In 2013 The Algemeiner listed Shoval on its Top 100 People Positively Influencing Jewish Life. In 2014, Shoval was appointed to serve as the chairman of the Uri Zvi Greenberg Heritage House in Jerusalem. He was a council member of Beyadenu: Public Council of the Temple Mount Heritage Foundation. In early 2014, Shoval represented Yisrael Beiteinu in the World Zionist Congress elections. He ran in the 2015 Knesset elections with the Jewish Home party. In 2015 he became the youngest chairman of the Professor's Circle for Political and Economic Resilience. Shoval was elected a board member of the World Zionist Organization, the Jewish Agency and Keren Hayesod. He was a columnist in the Israeli newspaper Israel-Hayom and has been printed in Haaretz, Maariv and Makor Rishon, Jewish News Syndicate, Human Events, Law & Liberty and Minding the Campus.

== Political Philosopher ==
In 2014 Shoval earned a PhD in Jewish political thought from the Paris West University Nanterre La Défense writing his thesis on La sainteté collective dans la politique biblique: aux sources de la théologie politique (Collective Holiness in Biblical Politics: The Sources of Political Theology).

He was an instructor at Bar-Ilan University, in the 2013-2014 academic year in the Department of Political Studies. He also taught at a pre-army mechina (preparatory program), and other colleges in Israel. He was a research associate at the Institute for Zionist Strategies.

In 2019 Shoval wrote the introduction to the Hebrew-language translation of Liberal Fascism: The Secret History of the American Left, from Mussolini to the Politics of Meaning by Jonah Goldberg.

In 2019 he became dean of the Tikvah Fund and founded the Argaman Institute, becoming head of its Herzl Seminar, a program for doctoral students in philosophy.

His essay Nietschze’s Thus Spake Zarathustra and Its Influence on Uri Zvi Greenberg’s “I Shall Tell in a Child’s Ears" was published by Bar-Ilan University Press in the February 2022 edition of Criticism & Interpretation - Journal for Interdisciplinary Studies in Literature and Culture.

In the 2022–2023 academic year he was a visiting associate research scholar and lecturer in politics at Princeton University at the James Madison Program in American Ideals and Institutions in the Department of Politics. He conducted research and taught a course called Virtues and the Meaning of Life in Different Cultures. In March 2023 Shoval was invited to speak at the Center for Jewish Life at Princeton. His speech was met by protesters who disrupted the event and forced it to end early. A month later, two Israeli-American professors at Princeton decried Shoval's appointment at the university. Bradford Wilson, executive director of the Princeton program Shoval was a part of, defended his appointment.

In 2023 he became a visiting fellow in Jewish and political thought at the Ethics and Public Policy Center.

In 2024 his book Holiness and Society: A Socio-Political Exploration of the Mosaic Tradition was published in English by Routledge The book argues that holiness is not just a religious ideal but an important principle in shaping political and ethical societies. Yoram Hazony reviewed the book stating "examines the key texts on holiness in Hebrew Scripture, proposing that the biblical ideal of a 'holy nation' provides a 'supreme norm' in light of which biblical law and the nation of Israel are given a shape." It received a positive review in The European Conservative.
