= Im Tirtzu =

Israel-based Zionist non-governmental organization

- Founded: 2006; 20 years ago
- Type: Non-governmental organization
- Registration no.: 580471662
- Region served: Israel
- Key people: Ronen Shoval (Founder) Matan Peleg (CEO)
- Website: https://imti.org.il/en

Im Tirtzu (Hebrew: אם תרצו, lit. 'If you will it') is a Zionist non-governmental organization (NGO) based in Israel. Its name is derived from an epigraph appended to the frontispiece of Theodor Herzl's novel Altneuland, "If you wish it, it is no fairy-tale", rendered into modern Hebrew in Nahum Sokolow's translation in 1903, as Im tirtzu ein zo agadah ("If you will it, it is no dream").

On its establishment in 2006, the organization stated that its mission was to renew "Zionist discourse, Zionist thinking and Zionist ideology to ensure the future of the Jewish nation and the State of Israel". Claiming to "strengthen and advance the values of Zionism in Israel", it sees itself as dedicated to combating a "campaign of de-legitimization against the State of Israel and to [provide] responses to Post-Zionist and Anti-Zionist phenomena". Im Tirtzu is mostly known for its campaigns against the New Israel Fund, foreign government-funded NGOs, and alleged bias in the curricula of Israeli universities.

According to critics, Im Tirtzu's strategies focus on delegitimizing Israeli left-wing and human-rights groups, and driving a wedge between them and their funding sources. Im Tirtzu operates fifteen branches at universities and colleges throughout the country, and runs the largest Zionist academic extra-curricular program in Israel. Some have maintained that the ideology of Im Tirtzu bears similarities to fascism, and others have labelled it an important Zionist movement. Im Tirtzu has received extensive support from the Israeli government.

== Overview ==
Im Tirtzu was set up in 2006 by Ronen Shoval and Erez Tadmor, and soon was closely meshed with a network of other bodies, new and old, such as The Legal Forum for the Land of Israel, Israel Sheli, Institute for Zionist Strategies, and NGO Monitor, organized to further Zionist aims. It was little known until February 2010 when it made headlines with a claim that Israeli NGOs, especially the New Israel Fund, were in good part responsible for the damage to Israel's international standing that resulted from the publication of the Goldstone Report regarding the conduct of the Gaza War (2008–2009). Some three months later, Kadima led by Ronit Tirosh, together with right wing parties, proposed a bill to outlaw any non-governmental organization that furnished foreign or international organizations with information that might buttress accusations of war crimes by either Israel or the IDF.

== Activity ==
=== Alleging politicization in academia ===
==== Ben-Gurion University ====
In 2008, Im Tirtzu published a report about the syllabuses used in various academic departments in Israel. According to the report, authors who reject the notion of nationality, or support anti-Zionist views, get much more exposure in reading lists. In 2010, Im Tirtzu sent Rivka Karmi, the head of the Ben-Gurion University of the Negev a letter, demanding that the university stop the anti-Zionist bias in its Department of Politics and Government. The letter alleged that 9 out of 11 professors in the department were involved in extreme left-wing activities (among others, attempting to persuade other countries to join the academic boycott of Israel). Im Tirtzu threatened to notify the donors of the university if the problem was not rectified.

In a joint statement about the above campaign, the heads of Israel's seven leading universities urged condemnation of what they called Im Tirtzu's "dangerous attempt to create a thought police". Im Tirtzu responded, "All Im Tirtzu asked from BGU is that a solution be found to the extreme bias found in the Political Science department, where only post-Zionist opinions are presented."

Following Im Tirtzu's report, the Israeli Council for Higher Education appointed an international committee to investigate the allegations. The committee came to the conclusion that the curriculum in the Political Science department was imbalanced. The committee said it was "concerned that the study of politics as a scientific discipline may be impeded by such strong emphasis on political activism", and recommended closing the department unless changes were made. The report was widely criticized by academics, who said that it was politically motivated, noting that well-known scholars had been rejected from the committee because of their political views and that the original committee chair had resigned. Minister of Education, Gideon Sa'ar, said "I believe the report is important since it encourages public discussion" but rejected any attempts to block or apply conditions for donations to Israeli universities.

In 2016 Im Tirtzu alleged that Ben-Gurion University was sponsoring a conference featuring the CEO and public relations coordinator of Breaking the Silence in violation of a ruling by Israel's Council for Higher Education against politicizing academia. The University denied claims of politicization and responded that it is a "pluralistic academic institution, which promotes and enables an open and diverse dialogue and does not seek to espouse a particular political viewpoint".

In response to the conference, a prominent donor and longstanding member of the university's board of governors announced that he was withholding a donation of $1 million due to the conference. The university responded that they were unaware of such a pledge.

==== Haifa University legal clinics ====
In 2013 Im Tirtzu released a report alleging "severe politicization" of the legal clinics at the University of Haifa. According to the report, 80% of the cases treated by the clinics dealt with security prisoners, among those convicted of terrorism and espionage. The report charged that certain clinics of the University are part of the "Arab nationalist struggle against Zionism" and "cooperate with organizations that oppose the existence of the State of Israel as a democratic state". Following the report, then Minister of Education Shai Piron together with the Council for Higher Education in Israel commissioned an international committee of experts to investigate the clinics. In 2016, the committee published its recommendations that matched "virtually all of the conclusions from the Im Tirtzu report".

==== Hebrew University's Minerva Center for Human Rights ====
Following numerous media reports citing Im Tirtzu's criticism of a Minerva Center program that offers students four academic credits and a scholarship in exchange for interning eight hours per week at a human rights organization, a group of bereaved families penned a letter to Education Minister Naftali Bennett calling on him to investigate the program. According to the bereaved families, they were "horrified" to learn that the program allows for internship at organizations including B'Tselem, HaMoked and Public Committee Against Torture in Israel, which they called "anti-Israel" organizations.

At a Knesset Education Committee that was convened to discuss the program, Hebrew University's legal advisor Pepi Yakirevich stated: "The program asks of students to volunteer 8 weekly hours in human rights organizations that the Law Faculty sees of holding high importance.... Do you expect for the Hebrew University to act as a content filter? At the moment there is no red line."

==== American Anthropological Association boycott vote ====
In 2016 Im Tirtzu released a report alleging the involvement of Israeli academics in the proposed resolution of the American Anthropological Association (AAA) to impose an academic boycott on Israel. The report cited a letter allegedly sent by 20 Israeli academics that the group said encouraged the members to vote in favor of the resolution. In light of the report, Yisrael Beiteinu Member of Knesset Oded Forer called an emergency session of the Knesset Education Committee that was attended by MKs from both sides of the political aisle.

=== Israeli involvement in Israeli Apartheid Week ===
In 2016 Im Tirtzu released a report stating that a number of Israeli citizens and organizations were among the participants in the annual Israeli Apartheid Week. The report named Zochrot and individuals including Ilan Pappe, Uri Davis and Jeff Halper. Guy Davidi, producer of 5 Broken Cameras who was also named in the report, responded by saying: "I strongly reject the attempt to present boycott actions taken by Israelis as an act of treason. In my view, boycotting and divesting are legitimate political actions that represent a positive way to protest -- a positive alternative to violent action, which I strongly condemn. It is the right of every person to choose to boycott certain products if they don't accept the origin or the way the product is manufactured."

=== "Nakba Nonsense" campaign ===
In May 2011, with the approach of Nakba Day, Im Tirtzu launched a campaign accompanied by a 70-page booklet titled "Nakba Harta" in Hebrew (נכבה חרטא), translated by The Jerusalem Post as "Nakba BS", and titled "Nakba Nonsense" in English. The booklet describes the 1948 Palestinian expulsion and flight, called Nakba by Palestinians, as "a lie that threatens to drown us like a tsunami" and attempts to discredit what Im Tirtzu regards as "a narrative of myths and lies dealing with the teaching of the founding of the State of Israel". On 15 May 2011, dozens of Im Tirtzu activists gathered outside the offices of UNRWA in Jerusalem holding signs and chanting, "They expelled, they attacked, they lost."

In 2016, Im Tirtzu set up a 15-foot-tall inflatable Pinocchio doll across from the Nakba ceremony at Tel Aviv University in order to "emphasize the lie of the Nakba." In 2019 it disrupted a Tel Aviv nakba commemoration by playing over loudspeakers the 2018 Eurovision Song Contest winner Netta Barzilai's Toy song during the minute of silence.

=== Support for IDF soldiers ===
Im Tirtzu has acted in a number of ways to support IDF soldiers:

- In March 2010, the "Azad" restaurant in Haifa refused to serve IDF soldiers claiming that "the uniform does not serve the atmosphere or the place". In response, Im Tirtzu protested outside the restaurant and even assisted the soldiers in filing a lawsuit. The Haifa supreme court ruled that this was an act of severe discrimination against IDF soldiers and required the restaurant owners to pay the soldiers a sum of 5,000 NIS.
- During Operation Protective Edge, clothing and food products donated by the public were sent through Im Tirtzu to IDF soldiers. Im Tirtzu also initiated a petition for filing UNHRC complaints against Hamas.
- Im Tirtzu supports IDF reservists. The organization also provides individual assistance to reservists and advocates for reserve soldiers to receive preferential grants.
- Im Tirtzu held a rally in support of Haredi soldiers and against the incitement they were experiencing from the Haredi community.

=== Work with minorities ===
Im Tirtzu has advocated for minorities in Israel to join the Israeli military. The Forum for Drafting the Christian Community and its founder Father Gabriel Naddaf have worked closely with Im Tirtzu to encourage and promote the safety of Christian Israelis who wish to perform IDF service. Father Naddaf is a frequent guest speaker at Im Tirtzu events and sits on their Public Council. Other Israeli Arabs who promote the integration of minorities in Israeli society have received awards from the movement.

Im Tirtzu has also organized social activities with Israeli minorities, including distributing clothing and toys in Bedouin kindergartens and organizing meetings and tours in Druze villages. Following an act of vandalism against Jerusalem's Dormition Abbey, in which vandals spray-painted anti-Christian slogans, Im Tirtzu activists arrived for a solidarity visit. Im Tirtzu CEO Matan Peleg stated: "[We] see this as an act that is at its very core both anti-Zionist as well as anti-Israeli, an act which dangerously threatens all of the Israeli society."

In 2015, a new parliamentary caucus to encourage minorities to join the army was created based on the idea of Im Tirtzu. The opening ceremony of the caucus was attended by MKs from parties including several political parties represented in the Knesset, notably not including the Joint List. In 2016, Im Tirtzu's fourth annual Zionist Conference for Human Rights centered around the integration of minorities, featuring speeches from Deputy Minister Ayoob Kara, Father Gabriel Naddaf and other Israeli Arabs.

=== "Program for Zionist Thought" ===
In 2012, Im Tirtzu inaugurated its first Program for Zionist Thought, a series of lectures given by prominent Israeli figures and personalities. The program is featured at Hebrew University, Tel Aviv University, Ben-Gurion University, University of Haifa, Bar-Ilan University, and Ariel University. Some of the speakers include Nobel Prize laureate Robert Aumann, Caroline Glick, Nitsana Darshan-Leitner, Father Gabriel Naddaf, Ben-Dror Yemini, Mordechai Kedar, Major General Yaakov Amidror, former MK Einat Wilf, Rabbi David Stav, Yoram Ettinger, and Ran Baratz. The program is the largest Zionist academic extra-curricular program in Israel.

=== Hebron tours ===
In 2016 Im Tirtzu began to organize student tours of Hebron together with the Committee of the Jewish Community of Hebron. The organization runs an extensive series of tours in Hebron, which according to Im Tirtzu CEO Matan Peleg, are aimed to provide an answer to the tours of Hebron given by left-wing NGO Breaking the Silence, which he dubs "de-legitimization and lies."

=== Ten year anniversary conference ===
In September 2017 Im Tirtzu held a conference celebrating ten years of activity. Hundreds of activists and supporters participated in the event, which featured a keynote speech from Speaker of the Knesset Yuli-Yoel Edelstein and video-recorded congratulatory messages from Prime Minister Benjamin Netanyahu, Defense Minister Avigdor Lieberman, Education Minister Naftali Bennett, Justice Minister Ayelet Shaked, Jerusalem Mayor Nir Barkat, and a number of other ministers, members of Knesset, and cultural figures.

=== Campaign against Mohammad Bakri ===
In 2012, Im Tirtzu organized a campaign against Israeli-Arab actor Mohammad Bakri who was slated to appear in Federico García Lorca's The House of Bernarda Alba at Tel Aviv's Tzavta Theater. Im Tirtzu objected to Bakri because of his involvement in the film Jenin, Jenin. In a Haaretz opinion piece, Im Tirtzu chairman Ronen Shoval called Jenin, Jenin an antisemitic blood libel "unprecedented in its fierceness" and referred to Bakri as a "sophisticated enemy". Shoval accused the Tzavta Club of offering a platform to "an inciter and a liar". Israeli theatre critic Michael Handelzalts observed in protest that the play itself has nothing to do with Jenin, Bakri's acting was "indisputably fine" and argued Im Tirzu critics showed no interest in a theatrical performance that was "exciting, amusing, interesting, affording unusual food for thought and unsatisfying".

== Criticism of New Israel Fund and foreign government funded NGOs ==
=== New Israel Fund ===
In 2010, Im Tirtzu published a document, and launched a campaign in the Israeli media that said there were connections between organizations supported by the New Israel Fund and the United Nations Fact Finding Mission on the Gaza Conflict (also known as the Goldstone Report). Im Tirtzu said that 92 percent of all Israeli testimonials in the report came from NIF funded organizations. The campaign included "vilifying" NIF chairwoman Naomi Chazan as an agent of Hamas and Iran and the diffusion of posters caricaturing her with a horn strapped by a string on her forehead (in Hebrew, the word for "horn" also means "fund"), and a caption reading Naomi-Goldstone-Chazan. According to Ron Kampeas (Jewish Telegraphic Agency) Im Tirtzu's report said 16 NIF affiliated groups comprised 14 percent of all sources for the Goldstone report, while stating in a separate section that these constitute 92 percent of Israel-based negative reporting in the Goldstone report; some reporting had incorrectly confused the two separate figures and accused Im Tirzu as being inaccurate.

Chazan claimed that, in her eyes, the campaign was directed against democracy itself. The executive director of the Association for Civil Rights in Israel, Hagai El-Ad, denied Im Tirtzu's allegations. Gideon Levy, writing in Haaretz, likened Im Tirtzu's campaign against NIF to fascist tactics. Gershon Baskin, a columnist in The Jerusalem Post, spoke out about the newspaper's decision to cancel Naomi Chazan's column and accused Im Tirtzu of using an "anti-Semitic motif" as part of a "witch-hunt" that "is reminiscent of the darkest days of McCarthyism". That poster was called "style Der Stürmer" by the Facebook group "Im Tirzu - fascists" and was charged for libel by "Im Tirtzu". Judge Refael Yaakobi accepted the characterization of Im Tirtzu's poster as being similar in style to that of the Nazi party's newspaper, writing in the court's decision, "examining that publication and the source for comparison reveals that indeed there is truth in the matter."

During Operation Pillar of Defense, Im Tirtzu published an open letter in American Jewish newspapers addressed to the New Israel Fund chair. The letter gave examples of NIF funded organizations that Im Tirtzu said accused Israel of war crimes, and asked if the NIF agrees with their accusations. The NIF rebutted Im Tirtzu's charges, stating, "Not one of the human rights organizations Im Tirtzu attacks accused Israel of war crimes in the recent Gaza action." NIF also quoted Avichai Mandelblit, the IDF's Chief Military Advocate General during Operation Cast Lead: "The organizations are a conduit for getting information on very important matters so that IDF activity is normative.... I'm trying to get at the truth and they really help us do that. Our cooperation with B'tselem [A NIF-supported group] stands out. They help us to speak with witnesses, to investigate complaints ... with all of the criticism from these organizations on us, their goal is to get to the truth." As a result of the report there were calls in the Knesset to investigate the NIF and its operational arms in Israel. Benny Begin, a cabinet minister at the time, characterized the allegations Im Tirtzu published as "lies" in a radio interview. Abe Foxman said it was "absurd to blame Goldstone on the NIF".

=== Campaign against "foreign moles" ===
In late 2015 Im Tirtzu came under the spotlight for a video, "The Foreign Agents — Revealed!", it released suggesting Israel was under siege with Israeli human rights activists, reliant on foreign funding, abetting terrorism. The film clip showed a Palestinian brandishing a knife with the intent of stabbing bystanders followed by a sequence of photos of named people, Breaking the Silence's Avner Givaryahu, B'tselem's Hagai El-Ad, Ishai Menuchin, chair of Amnesty Israel and head of the Public Committee Against Torture in Israel, and a Hamoked lawyer, Sigi Ben-Ari, who were portrayed in such a way as to imply they were accomplices of terrorism in an operation run by foreign countries. Menuchin was identified as a plant for Holland, Ben-Ari as an agent for Norway, Givaryahu as a foreign agent for Germany, El-Ad as an agent for the European Union. The Hebrew word used was shtulim (singular shatul), which Im Tirtzu translated as "foreign agents", actually means "implanted" and connotes "embedded, traitorous, terrorist-supporting moles". The four were subject to death threats on social media shortly afterwards. The film clip went viral, registering over 160,000 views on Ronen Shoval's Facebook page where it was posted. Shoval who had failed to win election that year as a The Jewish Home candidate, urged viewers to back a draft law that would clamp down on NGOs reliant on foreign assistance. The video's release came shortly after Likud's Yoav Kisch had declared his intention to push a bill branding such NGOs as moles, with Kisch using the same word shtulim employed by Im Tirtzu. The video itself was produced by Moshe Klughaft campaign manager for Education Minister Naftali Bennett, also from the Jewish Home party. The Anti-Defamation League criticized the video as "hate speech".

In January 2016 a bill, sponsored by Ayelet Shaked, was then proposed in the Knesset to crack down on foreign funding for NGOs active in the Israeli-Palestinian conflict. The bill would have required Israeli NGOs to register themselves as foreign agents. Numerous countries - Germany, the Netherlands, Britain and the European Union - expressed their concern. Newspaper coverage linked the bill to Im Tirtzu's inflammatory video. Also in that month Im Tirtzu launched a further campaign on the topic, entitled "Moles in Culture" which identified major cultural figures -Gila Almagor, Amos Oz, David Grossman, A. B. Yehoshua, Chava Alberstein and Rona Kenan- also as moles. This produced a strong backlash critical of the tactic, even among right-wing Likud members such as Benny Begin who branded the drive as 'fascist' and called for an investigation into Im Tirtzu's financial backers in order to rid Israel of 'this evil'. The organization's move was likened to McCarthyist witch-hunt. A few days later, Im Tirtzu apologized and its head, Matan Peleg, suspended himself, admitting his campaign had harmed Im Tirtzu. Shoval, its former CEO, sung the praises of McCarthyism on Twittera at the time.

=== HaMoked ===
In 2016 Im Tirtzu released a report claiming that the Israeli NGO HaMoked received over 15 million NIS from European governments and has submitted nearly 60 petitions to the Supreme Court from mid-2014 to 2016 on behalf of 48 families of Palestinian terrorists responsible for the murder of 50 people. HaMoked declined to comment on the report. In response to the report, MK Oded Forer submitted a bill that would require organizations that receive the majority of their funding from foreign governments to declare their funding sources on every document submitted to the court.

=== Zochrot ===
Im Tirtzu released a report ahead of 2017's International Holocaust Remembrance Day detailing Germany's funding of the NGO Zochrot, which works to "promote Israeli Jewish society's acknowledgement of and accountability for the ongoing injustices of the Nakba and the reconceptualization of Return as the imperative redress of the Nakba". According to the report, the Government of Germany had provided over 1,100,000 shekels ($290,000) to Zochrot from 2012 to 2016, which is used by Zochrot to engage in "anti-Israeli" activities including screening its "Film Festival on Nakba and the Right of Return" on college campuses during "Israeli Apartheid Week", promoting an "iNakba" smartphone application, and accusing Israel of "ethnic cleansing". Im Tirtzu contacted the German Ambassador to Israel over the funding, yet received no response.

=== Machsom Watch ===
In May 2011 the organization called on Attorney-General Yehuda Weinstein to launch a criminal investigation into the operations of Machsom Watch (an NIF funded organization) for allegedly violating an IDF order prohibiting Israelis from entering the Palestinian village of Awarta. About a week before the Shin Bet (Israel Security Agency) revealed the identities of the murder suspects for the Itamar attack, senior Machsom Watch activist, Raya Yaron, was photographed hugging the mother of one of the men. Yaron said many other human rights organizations had also visited the village.

=== Peace Now ===
In May 2012, Peace Now filed a police complaint that said Im Tirtzu activists had impersonated Peace Now activists and waved Palestinian flags during Jerusalem Day celebrations in what was reported as a presumed attempt to portray them as Palestinian sympathizers. They described Im Tirtzu as an "extremist movement" that, together with "extreme Islamic movements on the Arab side", they claimed would "drag us to a religious war steeped in blood". Im Tirtzu accused Peace Now of "impersonating an Israeli organization while operating with backing from foreign countries in order to give the Temple Mount to Palestinian Authority" and said freedom of speech gave them the right to ridicule Peace Now's positions.

=== National service in foreign governments funded NGOs ===
In 2016, Im Tirtzu issued a report stating that at least seven foreign government funded organizations that it deemed "anti-Israel" are eligible to receive Sherut Leumi (National Service) positions. In response to the report, MK Amir Ohana introduced a bill in cooperation with Im Tirtzu that was supported by Prime Minister Benjamin Netanyahu, which aimed to cancel national service positions in groups that receive the majority of their funding from foreign governments. The bill was later passed into law by the Knesset in a vote of 40–12.

=== Israeli organizations with UN advisor status ===
In 2015 Im Tirtzu released a report titled "Activity of Israeli Organizations with Advisor Status to the United Nations, Against Israeli Policy", which claims that three Israeli NGOs use their U.N. advisor to promote anti-Israel sentiments in the United Nations. According to the report, Adalah, Ittijah, and the Israeli Committee Against House Demolitions encourage the U.N. to accuse Israel of international law violations. These three organizations declined to comment on the report.

=== UN Fact Finding Mission on the 2014 Israel–Gaza conflict ===
Following the release of the findings by the "United Nations Fact Finding Mission on the 2014 Israel–Gaza conflict", Im Tirtzu released a report detailing the use by the UN of research by Israeli NGOs in the report. According to the report, the UN report contained 72 references to reports by B'tselem, 8 references to Adalah, 8 references to Breaking the Silence, 12 references to HaMoked: Center for the Defence of the Individual, and 5 references to Yesh Din.

=== Jerusalem ===
Ahead of 2016's Jerusalem Day, Im Tirtzu released a report claiming that the Palestinian organization Human Rights and International Humanitarian Law Secretariat transfers millions of dollars to Israeli NGOs in order to delegitimize Israel and "obscure Israeli sovereignty in Jerusalem". According to the report, the Human Rights and International Humanitarian Law Secretariat acts as an independent organizations that manages donations from Denmark, Sweden, Switzerland and Holland and then transfers them to pro-BDS Palestinian and Israeli NGOs. Sarit Michaeli, the spokesperson for B'Tselem – one of the NGOs named in the report as receiving funds – said "this is a recycled lie by Im Tirtzu. This money actually comes from Switzerland, Holland, Denmark and Sweden. This organization transfers the funds from the donating countries and deals with the bureaucracy of the transfer. The organization itself does not determine who receives the funds."

== Funding ==
=== Israel ===
In 2010, Im Tirtzu received funding from the following sources:

- The Azrieli Group, a shareholder in Bank Leumi and LeumiCard, which also owns 13 malls throughout the country and a controlling share in the Sonol, Tambour and Supergaz companies and is behind the Azrieli Center in Tel Aviv
- Leo Schachter, Israel's second-largest exporter of processed diamonds, headed by Elliot Tannenbaum
- Keren Segal Leyisrael, a fund headed by Jerusalem businessman Yotam Bar-Hama
- The Forum for Religious Zionism, an organization registered in 2010 in the name of Zvi Soibel, former director of the Bnei Akiva yeshiva in Kfar Haroeh.

=== United States ===
In 2009, Im Tirtzu's largest donor was the John Hagee Ministries (JHM) via the Christian-Zionist organization Christians United for Israel (CUFI). Im Tirtzu received US$100,000 from JHM and $34,000 from other sources. In 2010, The Jerusalem Post reported that JHM "expressed deep displeasure" with Im Tirtzu after its campaigns against the New Israel Fund and Ben-Gurion University and announced the cessation of its funding. A JHM spokesman said that Im Tirtzu "misrepresented its focus when they told us their mission was strictly Zionist education". rather than "political" activity according to a spokesperson for the Evangelical organization.

According to Uri Blau, in an Haaretz investigation Im Tirtzu, though highly critical of foreign governmental funding for 'leftist' Israeli NGOs, is itself the beneficiary of substantial donations from two American organisations closely associated with Prime Minister Benjamin Netanyahu. During the 2015 election, Shining City, a U.S. front group, contributed 3.7 million shekels (about 1 million U.S. dollars) to Im Tirtzu. Rabbi Aryeh Lightstone, the alleged leader of Shining City, served as senior adviser to then U.S. ambassador to Israel David M. Friedman. According to Im Tirzu, most of its donors are Israelis, but the group is "pleased to find private donors from around the world as well (individuals and private foundations)" except those that are from a "foreign state entity or foundations that promote delegitimization of Israeli society".

== Leadership ==
The group was founded in 2006 by Ronen Shoval, who also served as its chairman until his retirement in 2013, and Erez Tadmor, who was a group spokesperson until his retirement in 2011.

Following Ronen's retirement, Matan Peleg was elected as Im Tirtzu's chairman. Peleg was the founder of the Im Tirtzu branch in Haifa and the head of the northern branch of the movement. After Erez's retired, Matan replaced him in the role of missions coordinator. Alon Schwartzer was elected as head of the policy department alongside Matan.

Matan Peleg suspended himself in January 2016 in the wake of an Im Tirtzu campaign against Israeli artists who supported human rights groups. Several months later in May 2016 Peleg returned to his role.

== Reception ==
=== Likened to fascist groups ===
A NIS 2.6-million lawsuit was filed by Im Tirtzu against Israelis who had opened a Facebook page that suggested that Im Tirtzu was a fascist group. A court in Jerusalem rejected some of the charges but found one person guilty of slander. In the verdict the Judge Refael Ya'akobi found that there were commonalities between the group and "certain principles of Fascism". He also stated that it is clear that the defendants are "bitter adversaries" of Im Tirtzu. He additionally wrote that the defendants do not imply a full identification of fascism with Im Tirtzu, but only some common lines. Finally the judge ruled that as Im Tirtzu emphasizes national aspects, the defendants can rely on the protections set in the law in order to be acquitted. and wrote also that there is truth in comparing the poster of "Im Tirtzu" against the New Israel Fund to the style of the Nazi newspaper Der Stürmer. The judge wrote: "One should view these publications (against Im Tirtzu) as saying and warning that past experience teaches that support of similar principles to those that Im Tirtzu supports ... brought harsh and bad results." In September 2013, the judge rejected the majority of Im Tirtzu's arguments, and cleared four of the five defendants. One defendant, Roy Yellin, was found to have libeled Im Tirtzu by implying that the group shared the "Nazi race theory". However, the judge criticised Im Tirtzu for bringing the action in the first place, and postponed awarding any damages for the one successful claim. In February 2014, the court rejected Im Tirtzu's claim for damages, though it also rejected the defendants' claim for legal costs. Both Im Tirtzu and the defendants appealed to the High Court. In the appeal, the High Court declared the previous ruling as void and null and decided that the libel suit should have not been heard in court, since the main discussion is ideological, not juridical.

In court proceedings, Professor Zeev Sternhell, one of the world's leading experts on Fascism, testified that Im Tirtzu was "not worse than Fascism, it is that, more or less". He also testified that Fascist principles "provide a basis for Im Tirtzu's operations". Sternhell analyzed the writings published by Im Tirtzu and observed expressions of fascist thinking in the writings of the group's founder. These include seeing the nation as an organic body, viewing the West as being weakened, and describing the situation in the country as an emergency situation that requires unusual action against "traitors".

Other court testimony documented that Im Tirtzu's founder admitted to drawing inspiration from German philosophers considered to have been precursors to Fascist ideology.

In 2016, Knesset Member Benny Begin (Likud) also used the term "Fascist" to describe a campaign by the organization.

=== Criticism ===
The organization was accused of acting in an Anti-Semitic fashion, including emulating Nazi propaganda, in its criticisms of U.S. Ambassador Martin Indyk and of the New Israel Fund.

Haaretz newspaper alleged that "Im Tirtzu has taken over political discourse in Israel, and injected into it the crazy idea of the internal enemy," and accused The Jewish Home party as "operating as the political arm of Im Tirtzu."

Zehava Gal-On accused Im Tirtzu of being "the military arm of [Benjamin] Netanyahu" that aids him in marking "enemies from within."

=== Support ===
Israeli Prime Minister Benjamin Netanyahu has publicly endorsed Im Tirtzu.

Im Tirtzu has been active on college campuses throughout Israel, and has received support from members of the Israeli Parliament and prominent Israeli writers and personalities.

Arutz Sheva has described Im Tirtzu as the largest Zionist movement in Israel.

In a 2012 Ministry of Culture and Education competition, Im Tirtzu won first prize for their video titled, "Zionism Without Jerusalem?" In a competition featuring almost 150 entries, Im Tirtzu's video won the most popular video, and was awarded a prize of 25,000 shekels.
