= Daratumumab/hyaluronidase =

Combination drug

Combination of
- Daratumumab: CD38-directed cytolytic antibody
- Hyaluronidase: Endoglycosidase

Clinical data
- Trade names: Darzalex Faspro
- AHFS/Drugs.com: Micromedex Detailed Consumer Information
- MedlinePlus: a620040
- License data: US DailyMed: Daratumumab and hyaluronidase
- Routes of administration: Subcutaneous
- ATC code: None

Legal status
- Legal status: US: ℞-only

Identifiers
- KEGG: D11967

Daratumumab/hyaluronidase, sold under the brand name Darzalex Faspro, is a fixed-dose combination medication for the treatment of adults with newly diagnosed or relapsed/refractory multiple myeloma. It is a combination of daratumumab and hyaluronidase. It is administered via subcutaneous injection.

The most common adverse reaction using daratumumab/hyaluronidase as monotherapy is upper respiratory tract infection. The most common adverse reactions (≥20%) in people with amyloid light-chain amyloidosis who received daratumumab/hyaluronidase in combination with bortezomib, cyclophosphamide, and dexamethasone are upper respiratory tract infection, diarrhea, peripheral edema, constipation peripheral sensory neuropathy, fatigue, nausea, insomnia, dyspnea and cough. The most common adverse reactions (≥20%) occurring in people treated with daratumumab/hyaluronidase, carfilzomib, and dexamethasone were upper respiratory tract infections, fatigue, insomnia, hypertension, diarrhea, cough, dyspnea, headache, pyrexia, nausea, and edema peripheral.

== Medical uses ==
Daratumumab/hyaluronidase is indicated for the treatment of adults with multiple myeloma:

- in combination with bortezomib, melphalan and prednisone (D-VMP) in newly diagnosed adults who are ineligible for autologous stem cell transplant
- in combination with lenalidomide and dexamethasone (D-Rd) in newly diagnosed adults who are ineligible for autologous stem cell transplant and in people with relapsed or refractory multiple myeloma who have received at least one prior therapy
- in combination with bortezomib and dexamethasone (D-Vd) in adults who have received at least one prior therapy
- as monotherapy, in adults who have received at least three prior lines of therapy including a proteasome inhibitor (PI) and an immunomodulatory agent or who are double-refractory to a PI and an immunomodulatory agent.

In January 2021, the US Food and Drug Administration (FDA) granted accelerated approval to daratumumab/hyaluronidase in combination with bortezomib, cyclophosphamide, and dexamethasone for newly diagnosed amyloid light-chain amyloidosis.

In November 2021, the FDA granted approval to daratumumab/hyaluronidase in combination with carfilzomib plus dexamethasone to treat relapsed or refractory multiple myeloma in adults who have received one to three prior lines of therapy.

In August 2024, the FDA granted approval to daratumumab/hyaluronidase in combination with bortezomib, lenalidomide, and dexamethasone for induction and consolidation in people with newly diagnosed multiple myeloma who are eligible for autologous stem cell transplant (ASCT).

In November 2025, the indication in the US was expanded to include the treatment of adults with high-risk smoldering multiple myeloma.

== Adverse effects ==
The US prescribing information includes warnings and precautions for cardiac toxicity, stating that serious or fatal cardiac adverse reactions occurred in people with light chain amyloidosis who received daratumumab/hyaluronidase in combination with dexamethasone, along with warnings and precautions for hypersensitivity and other administrative reactions, neutropenia, thrombocytopenia, embryo-fetal toxicity, and interference with cross-matching and red blood cell antibody screening.

== History ==
It was approved for use in the United States in May 2020.

Efficacy of daratumumab and hyaluronidase (monotherapy) was evaluated in the COLUMBA trial (NCT03277105), an open-label non-inferiority trial randomizing 263 participants to daratumumab and hyaluronidase and 259 to intravenous daratumumab (daratumumab IV). The trial's co-primary endpoints were overall response rate (ORR) and pharmacokinetic (PK) endpoint of the maximum Ctrough on cycle 3, day 1 pre-dose. Daratumumab and hyaluronidase was non-inferior to daratumumab IV in evaluating these two endpoints.

Efficacy of daratumumab and hyaluronidase in combination with VMP (D-VMP) was evaluated in a single-arm cohort of the PLEIADES trial (NCT03412565), a multi-cohort, open‑label trial. Eligible participants were required to have newly diagnosed multiple myeloma and were ineligible for transplant.

Efficacy of daratumumab and hyaluronidase in combination with Rd (D-Rd) was evaluated in a single-arm cohort of this trial. Eligible participants had received at least one prior line of therapy.

Efficacy of daratumumab/hyaluronidase in combination with bortezomib, cyclophosphamide, and dexamethasone was evaluated in ANDROMEDA (NCT03201965), an open-label, randomized, active-controlled trial in 388 participants with newly diagnosed amyloid light-chain amyloidosis with measurable disease and at least one affected organ according to consensus criteria. Participants were randomized to receive bortezomib, cyclophosphamide, and dexamethasone (VCd arm) or with daratumumab and hyaluronidase (D-VCd arm).

Efficacy of daratumumab/hyaluronidase in combination with carfilzomib and dexamethasone was evaluated in PLEIADES (NCT03412565), a multi-cohort, open-label trial.

Efficacy of daratumumab and hyaluronidase as monotherapy versus active monitoring for high-risk smoldering multiple myeloma was evaluated in AQUILA (NCT03301220), an open-label, randomized trial in 390 participants with high-risk SMM. Participants randomized to the treatment arm received daratumumab and hyaluronidase 1,800 mg/30,000 units administered subcutaneously once weekly from weeks 1 to 8, once every 2 weeks from weeks 9 to 24 and once every 4 weeks starting with week 25 until 39 cycles or up to 36 months or until diagnosis to multiple myeloma or unacceptable toxicity. Forty-one percent of participants had 2 or more of the following criteria for high-risk smoldering multiple myeloma: serum monoclonal protein level >2 g/dL, involved-to-uninvolved serum-free light chain ratio >20, and bone marrow plasma cells >20%.

In November 2025, the US Food and Drug Administration (FDA) granted traditional approval to daratumumab/hyaluronidase with bortezomib, cyclophosphamide, and dexamethasone for newly diagnosed light chain amyloidosis. The FDA granted accelerated approval for this indication in 2021.
