= Retinoic acid-inducible orphan G protein-coupled receptor =

Group of G protein-coupled receptors

G protein-coupled receptor, family C, group 5, member A

Identifiers
- Symbol: GPRC5A
- Alt. symbols: RAIG1, RAI3
- NCBI gene: 9052
- HGNC: 9836
- OMIM: 604138
- RefSeq: NM_003979
- UniProt: Q8NFJ5

Other data
- Locus: Chr. 12 p13-p12.3
Search for
- Structures: Swiss-model
- Domains: InterPro

G protein coupled receptor, family C, group 5, member B

Identifiers
- Symbol: GPRC5B
- Alt. symbols: RAIG2
- NCBI gene: 51704
- HGNC: 13308
- OMIM: 605948
- RefSeq: NM_016235
- UniProt: Q9NZH0

Other data
- Locus: Chr. 16 p12
Search for
- Structures: Swiss-model
- Domains: InterPro

G protein-coupled receptor, family C, group 5, member C

Identifiers
- Symbol: GPRC5C
- Alt. symbols: RAIG3
- NCBI gene: 55890
- HGNC: 13309
- OMIM: 605949
- RefSeq: NM_022036
- UniProt: Q9NQ84

Other data
- Locus: Chr. 17 q25
Search for
- Structures: Swiss-model
- Domains: InterPro

G protein-coupled receptor, family C, group 5, member D

Identifiers
- Symbol: GPRC5D
- NCBI gene: 55507
- HGNC: 13310
- OMIM: 607437
- RefSeq: NM_018654
- UniProt: Q9NZD1

Other data
- Locus: Chr. 12 p13.3
Search for
- Structures: Swiss-model
- Domains: InterPro

The Retinoic Acid-Inducible orphan G-protein-coupled receptors (RAIG) are a group of four closely related G protein-coupled receptors whose expression is induced by retinoic acid.

The exact function of these proteins has not been determined but they may provide a mechanism by which retinoic acid can influence G protein signal transduction cascades. In addition, RAIG receptors interact with members of the frizzled class of G protein-coupled receptors and appear to activate the Wnt signaling pathway.
