= GPRC5B =

Protein-coding gene in the species Homo sapiens

Identifiers
- Aliases: GPRC5B, RAIG-2, RAIG2, G protein-coupled receptor class C group 5 member B
- External IDs: OMIM: 605948; MGI: 1927596; GeneCards: GPRC5B

Gene location (Human)
Chr.	Chromosome 16 (human)
Band	16p12.3	Start	19,856,691 bp
Band	16p12.3	End	19,886,167 bp

Gene location (Mouse)
Chr.	Chromosome 7 (mouse)
Band	7|7 F2	Start	118,571,270 bp
Band	7|7 F2	End	118,594,434 bp
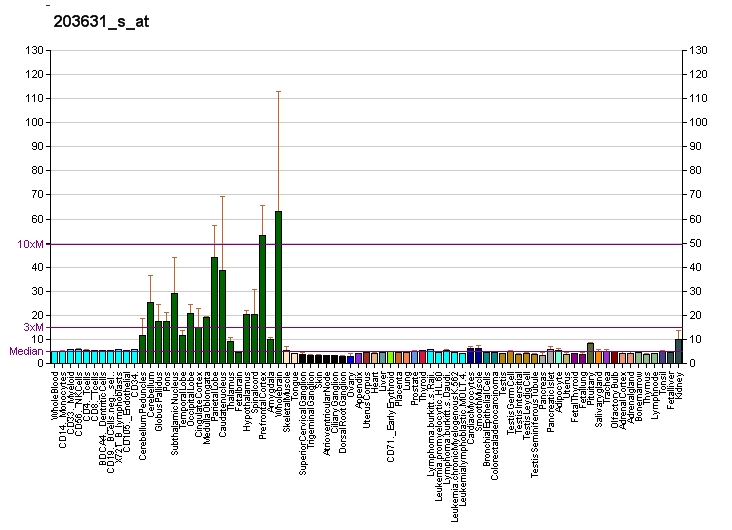

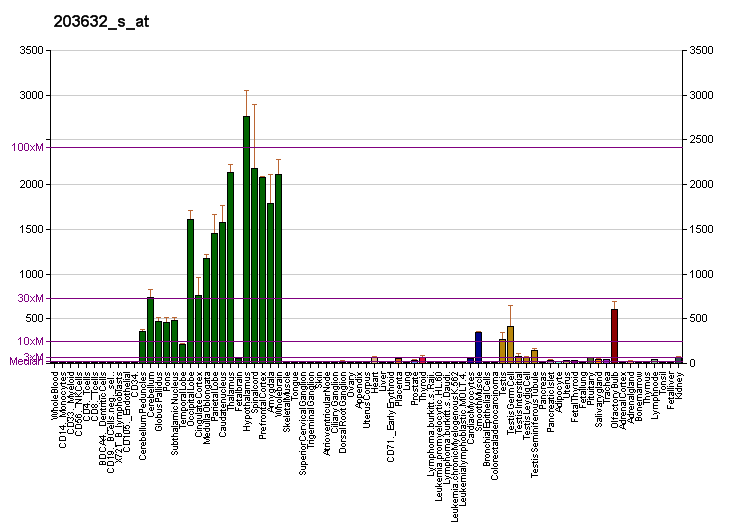
RNA expression pattern
Bgee	Human / Mouse (ortholog); Top expressed in: internal globus pallidus; inferior olivary nucleus; inferior ganglion of vagus nerve; dorsal motor nucleus of vagus nerve; middle frontal gyrus; external globus pallidus; subthalamic nucleus; superior vestibular nucleus; ventral tegmental area; C1 segment / Top expressed in: epithelium of lens; deep cerebellar nuclei; pontine nuclei; dentate gyrus of hippocampal formation granule cell; lobe of cerebellum; cerebellar vermis; saccule; medial vestibular nucleus; substantia nigra; motor neuron; More reference expression data
BioGPS	More reference expression data
Gene ontology
Molecular function	G protein-coupled receptor activity; signal transducer activity; protein kinase activator activity; G protein-coupled receptor binding; protein kinase binding
Cellular component	integral component of membrane; intracellular membrane-bounded organelle; membrane; plasma membrane; nucleolus; extracellular exosome; cytoplasmic vesicle membrane; cytoplasmic vesicle; nucleus; extracellular space; cytosol; cell surface; receptor complex
Biological process	G protein-coupled receptor signaling pathway; signal transduction; activation of protein kinase activity; positive regulation of I-kappaB kinase/NF-kappaB signaling; positive regulation of neuron differentiation; positive regulation of inflammatory response; positive regulation of macrophage cytokine production; positive regulation of protein tyrosine kinase activity; positive regulation of canonical Wnt signaling pathway; locomotory behavior; positive regulation of neuron projection development; glucose homeostasis
Sources:Amigo / QuickGO
Orthologs
Databases	NCBI: entry; OMA: entry
Species	Human	Mouse
Entrez	51704	64297
Ensembl	ENSG00000167191	ENSMUSG00000008734
UniProt	Q9NZH0	Q923Z0
RefSeq (mRNA)	NM_001304771; NM_016235	NM_001195774; NM_022420
RefSeq (protein)	NP_001291700; NP_057319	NP_001182703; NP_071865
Location (UCSC)	Chr 16: 19.86 – 19.89 Mb	Chr 7: 118.57 – 118.59 Mb
PubMed search
- Wikidata
View/Edit Human	View/Edit Mouse

G-protein coupled receptor family C group 5 member B is a protein that in humans is encoded by the GPRC5B gene.

== Function ==
The protein encoded by this gene is a member of the type 3 G protein-coupled receptor family. Members of this superfamily are characterized by a signature 7-transmembrane domain motif. The specific function of this protein is unknown; however, this protein may mediate the cellular effects of retinoic acid on the G protein signal transduction cascade.

== Clinical significance ==
Dominant mutations in GPRC5B have been identified as an ultra-rare cause of the neurological white matter disease Megalencephalic Leukoencephalopathy with subcortical Cysts (MLC). Affected individuals present with early-onset macrocephaly, mild motor developmental delay, slowly progressive ataxia, and characteristic brain MRI findings including diffuse white matter abnormalities and subcortical cysts. Disruption of GPRC5B impairs brain water homeostasis, leading to the clinical and radiological features of this leukodystrophy.

== See also ==
- Retinoic acid-inducible orphan G protein-coupled receptor
