= Camidanlumab tesirine =

Antibody-drug conjugate

- Chemical structure of tesirine (black) linked to a cysteine of camidanlumab (blue)

Monoclonal antibody
- Type: ?
- Source: Human
- Target: CD25

Clinical data
- Other names: ADCT-301
- ATC code: none

Identifiers
- CAS Number: 1853239-04-9
- ChemSpider: none
- UNII: LYJ1AEJ9YH
- KEGG: D11325

Chemical and physical data
- Formula: C_{6548}H_{10150}N_{1732}O_{2038}S_{42}
- Molar mass: 147091.83 g·mol^{−1}

Camidanlumab tesirine (Cami-T or ADCT-301) is an antibody-drug conjugate (ADC) composed of a human antibody that binds to the protein CD25, conjugated to a pyrrolobenzodiazepine dimer toxin. The experimental drug, developed by ADC Therapeutics is being tested in clinical trials for the treatment of B-cell Hodgkin's lymphoma (HL) and non-Hodgkin lymphoma (NHL), and for the treatment of B-cell acute lymphoblastic leukemia (ALL) and acute myeloid leukemia (AML).

== Technology ==
The human monoclonal antibody is conjugated via a cleavable linker to a cytotoxic (anticancer) pyrrolobenzodiazepine (PBD) dimer. The antibody binds to CD25, which is the alpha chain of the interleukin 2 receptor IL2RA. This molecule is expressed mainly on activated T- and B-cells, both of which are types of white blood cells that play a role in the human immune system. CD25 is over-expressed in a wide range of hematological malignancies, such as leukemias and lymphomas. After binding to a CD25-expressing cell, the antibody is internalized into the cell where enzymes release the cytotoxic drug. PBD dimers work by crosslinking specific sites of the DNA, blocking the cancer cells’ division that cause the cells to die. As a class of DNA-crosslinking agents they are significantly more potent than systemic chemotherapeutic drugs.

== Clinical trials ==
Two phase I trials are evaluating the drug in patients with relapsed or refractory Hodgkin’s and non-Hodgkin’s lymphoma and relapsed or refractory CD25-positive acute myeloid leukemia or acute lymphoblastic leukemia. At the 59th American Society of Hematology (ASH) Annual Meeting, interim results from a Phase I, open-label, single agent dose-escalating study designed to evaluate the treatment of camidanlumab tesirine in relapsed or refractory Hodgkin’s or non-Hodgkin’s lymphoma were presented. Among the patients enrolled at the time of the data cutoff the overall response rate was 78% (including a 44% complete response rate) in patients with relapsing or refractory Hodgkin’s lymphoma.
