= GPRC5C =

Protein-coding gene in the species Homo sapiens

Identifiers
- Aliases: GPRC5C, RAIG-3, RAIG3, G protein-coupled receptor class C group 5 member C
- External IDs: OMIM: 605949; MGI: 1917605; GeneCards: GPRC5C

Gene location (Human)
Chr.	Chromosome 17 (human)
Band	17q25.1	Start	74,424,851 bp
Band	17q25.1	End	74,451,653 bp

Gene location (Mouse)
Chr.	Chromosome 11 (mouse)
Band	11|11 E2	Start	114,741,978 bp
Band	11|11 E2	End	114,763,443 bp
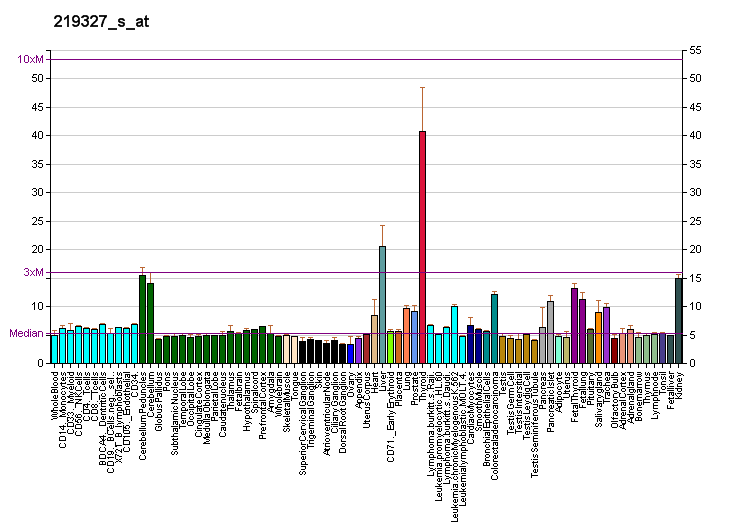
RNA expression pattern
Bgee	Human / Mouse (ortholog); Top expressed in: right lobe of liver; olfactory zone of nasal mucosa; mucosa of transverse colon; right lobe of thyroid gland; cerebellar hemisphere; left lobe of thyroid gland; right hemisphere of cerebellum; body of pancreas; body of stomach; popliteal artery / Top expressed in: lumbar spinal ganglion; right kidney; genital tubercle; tail of embryo; proximal tubule; inner renal medulla; zygote; yolk sac; muscle of thigh; human kidney; More reference expression data
BioGPS	More reference expression data
Gene ontology
Molecular function	G protein-coupled receptor activity; signal transducer activity; protein kinase activator activity
Cellular component	integral component of membrane; vesicle; receptor complex; plasma membrane; integral component of plasma membrane; extracellular exosome; cytoplasmic vesicle membrane; membrane; cytoplasmic vesicle; intracellular membrane-bounded organelle
Biological process	G protein-coupled receptor signaling pathway; signal transduction; activation of protein kinase activity
Sources:Amigo / QuickGO
Orthologs
Databases	NCBI: entry; OMA: entry
Species	Human	Mouse
Entrez	55890	70355
Ensembl	ENSG00000170412	ENSMUSG00000051043
UniProt	Q9NQ84	Q8K3J9
RefSeq (mRNA)	NM_018653; NM_022036; NM_001366261; NM_001366262	NM_001110337; NM_001110338; NM_147217
RefSeq (protein)	NP_061123; NP_071319; NP_001353190; NP_001353191	NP_001103807; NP_001103808; NP_671750
Location (UCSC)	Chr 17: 74.42 – 74.45 Mb	Chr 11: 114.74 – 114.76 Mb
PubMed search
- Wikidata
View/Edit Human	View/Edit Mouse

G-protein coupled receptor family C group 5 member C is a protein that in humans is encoded by the GPRC5C gene.

== Function ==
The protein encoded by this gene is a member of the type 3 G protein-coupled receptor family. Members of this superfamily are characterized by a signature 7-transmembrane domain motif. The specific function of this protein is unknown; however, this protein may mediate the cellular effects of retinoic acid on the G protein signal transduction cascade. Two transcript variants encoding different isoforms have been found for this gene.

== See also ==
- Retinoic acid-inducible orphan G protein-coupled receptor
