= MAbs (journal) =

mAbs
- Discipline: Antibodies
- Language: English
- Edited by: Janice M. Reichert

Publication details
- History: 2009-present
- Publisher: Taylor & Francis
- Frequency: 8/year
- Impact factor: 5.165 (2017)

Standard abbreviations
- ISO 4: mAbs

Indexing
- ISSN: 1942-0862 (print); 1942-0870 (web)
- LCCN: 2008215188
- OCLC no.: 225933748

Links
- Journal homepage; List of issues

mAbs is a peer-reviewed multi-disciplinary scientific journal established in 2009, published by Taylor & Francis and dedicated to the art and science of antibody research and development. Its editor-in-chief is Janice M. Reichert and it is affiliated with The Antibody Society. The journal has a strong scientific and medical focus, but also strives to serve a broader readership. The articles are thus of interest to scientists, clinical researchers, and physicians, as well as the wider mAb community, including readers involved in technology transfer, legal issues, investment, strategic planning and the regulation of therapeutics. It is indexed in MEDLINE, PubMed, the Science Citation Index Expanded, Biological Abstracts, BIOSIS Previews, and Scopus.
