= Talquetamab =

Monoclonal antibody

Monoclonal antibody
- Type: Bi-specific T-cell engager
- Source: Humanized
- Target: GPRC5D, CD3

Clinical data
- Trade names: Talvey
- Other names: Talquetamab-tgvs
- AHFS/Drugs.com: Monograph
- MedlinePlus: a623047
- License data: US DailyMed: Talquetamab
- Pregnancy category: Contraindicated
- Routes of administration: Subcutaneous
- ATC code: L01FX29 (WHO)

Legal status
- Legal status: AU: S4 (Prescription only); CA: ℞-only / Schedule D; US: ℞-only; EU: Rx-only

Identifiers
- CAS Number: 2226212-40-2
- DrugBank: DB16678
- UNII: 4W3KFI3TN3
- KEGG: D12180

Talquetamab, sold under the brand name Talvey, is a humanized monoclonal antibody used for the treatment of multiple myeloma. It is a bispecific GPRC5D-directed CD3 T-cell engager. Talquetamab is a bispecific antibody against two targets: human CD3, a T-cell surface antigen, and human G-protein coupled receptor family C group 5 member D (GPRC5D), a tumor-associated antigen with potential antineoplastic activity. Talquetamab binds both targets, drawing the T cells close to the tumor cells, causing a cytotoxic T-lymphocyte response. It is being developed by Janssen Pharmaceuticals.

The most common adverse reactions include cytokine release syndrome, dysgeusia, nail disorder, musculoskeletal pain, skin disorder, rash, fatigue, decreased weight, dry mouth, pyrexia, xerosis, dysphagia, upper respiratory tract infection, and diarrhea.

Talquetamab was approved for medical use in both the United States and the European Union in August 2023. The US Food and Drug Administration (FDA) considers it to be a first-in-class medication.

== Medical uses ==
Talquetamab is indicated for the treatment of adults with relapsed or refractory multiple myeloma who have received prior lines of therapy, including a proteasome inhibitor, an immunomodulatory agent, and an anti-CD38 monoclonal antibody.

== Adverse effects ==
The US Food and Drug Administration (FDA) label prescribing information has a boxed warning for life-threatening or fatal cytokine release syndrome and neurologic toxicity, including immune effector cell-associated neurotoxicity.

== Structure ==
In 2024, the molecular structure of GPRC5D complexed with talquetamab Fab (anti GPRC5D) were characterized by using cryogenic electron microscopy. Structural analysis of the complex has revealed that talquetamab Fab lodges at a shallow pocket on the extracellular surface of GPRC5D and recognizes ECLs and TM3/5/7 of one GPRC5D protomer via six CDRs.

== History ==
Efficacy was evaluated in MMY1001 (MonumenTAL-1) (NCT03399799, NCT04634552), a single-arm, open-label, multicenter study that included 187 participants who had previously received at least four prior systemic therapies. Participants received talquetamab-tgvs 0.4 mg/kg subcutaneously weekly, following two step-up doses in the first week of therapy, or talquetamab-tgvs 0.8 mg/kg subcutaneously biweekly (every two weeks), following three step-up doses, until disease progression or unacceptable toxicity.

The main efficacy outcome measures were overall response rate and duration of response as assessed by an independent review committee using IMWG criteria. The primary efficacy population consisted of participants who had previously received at least four prior lines of therapies, including a proteasome inhibitor, an immunomodulatory agent, and an anti-CD38 monoclonal antibody. Overall response rate in the 100 participants receiving 0.4 mg/kg weekly was 73% (95% confidence interval (CI): 63.2%, 81.4%) and median duration of response was 9.5 months (95% CI: 6.5, not estimable). Overall response rate in the 87 participants receiving 0.8 mg/kg biweekly was 73.6% (95% CI: 63%, 82.4%) and median duration of response was not estimable. An estimated 85% of responders maintained response for at least nine months.

The FDA granted the application for talquetamab priority review, breakthrough therapy, and orphan drug designations.

== Society and culture ==
=== Legal status ===
In the United States, Janssen received breakthrough therapy designation for talquetamab in June 2022, for the treatment of adults with relapsed or refractory multiple myeloma, who have previously received at least four prior lines of therapy, including a proteasome inhibitor, an immunomodulatory agent, and an anti-CD38 antibody. Janssen filed for approval from the FDA in December 2022, and from the European Medicines Agency in January 2023.

On 20 July 2023, the Committee for Medicinal Products for Human Use (CHMP) of the European Medicines Agency (EMA) adopted a positive opinion, recommending the granting of a conditional marketing authorization for the medicinal product Talvey, intended for the treatment of multiple myeloma. Talvey was reviewed under EMA's accelerated assessment program. The applicant for this medicinal product is Janssen-Cilag International N.V. Talquetamab was approved for medical use in the European Union in August 2023.

== External list ==
- Clinical trial number NCT03399799 for "Dose Escalation Study of Talquetamab in Participants With Relapsed or Refractory Multiple Myeloma (MonumenTAL-1)" at ClinicalTrials.gov
- Clinical trial number NCT04634552 for "A Study of Talquetamab in Participants With Relapsed or Refractory Multiple Myeloma" at ClinicalTrials.gov
