= Inclacumab =

Monoclonal antibody

Monoclonal antibody
- Type: Whole antibody
- Source: Human
- Target: selectin P

Clinical data
- Other names: LC1004-002
- ATC code: none

Identifiers
- CAS Number: 1256258-86-2
- ChemSpider: none
- UNII: A6734I702L
- KEGG: D10356

Chemical and physical data
- Formula: C_{6452}H_{9930}N_{1730}O_{2024}S_{42}
- Molar mass: 145465.02 g·mol^{−1}

Inclacumab (LC1004-002) (INN) is a human monoclonal antibody designed for the treatment of cardiovascular disease.

The antibody is outlicensed by Roche.
