= Ordesekimab =

Monoclonal antibody

Monoclonal antibody
- Type: Whole antibody
- Source: Human

Gene therapy
- Target gene: Interleukin 15

Clinical data
- Other names: AMG-714; AMG714, PRV-015; PRV015, HuMax IL-15, MAb146B7

Identifiers
- CAS Number: 2394931-19-0
- DrugBank: D12306
- UNII: EJ48MR05C3
- ChEBI: CHEBI:754255
- ChEMBL: ChEMBL2109467

Chemical and physical data
- Formula: C_{6454}H_{9956}N_{1716}O_{2008}S_{44}
- Molar mass: 145127.29 g·mol^{−1}

Ordesekimab is an anti-interleukin 15 monoclonal antibody developed by Amgen to treat refractory celiac disease.
