= Leo Schachter =

Israeli diamantaire (1924–2021)

Yitzhak Arie (Leo) Schachter (Hebrew: יצחק אריה (לאון) שכטמן; 19 March 1924 – 11 May 2019) was a prominent Israeli diamantaire and the founder and owner of Leo Schachter Diamonds. Schachter was born in Brooklyn, New York in 1924. A second generation dimantaire, Schachter started his diamond polishing business at the age of 18. He was inspired by his father Max who learnt the art of diamond cutting in Belgium.

== Business ==
In 1952, Schachter founded the company Beck and Schachter. Over time, Schachter's company engaged in multiple stages of diamond supply, from diamond manufacturing to jewelry setting. Fourteen years later in 1966, Schachter achieved his first diamond sight from De Beers. For four decades, Leo Schachter Diamonds was the top Israeli diamond exporter. Gradually the company became a diamond empire. By 1970s Schachter became the biggest diamond manufacturer in New York city. In 1981, Schachter formed partnership with Avraham and Moshe Namdar. Schachter & Namdar got its De Beers first sight and grew to becomeone of the largest diamond companies in the world. By 1982, Schachter moved his sales and operations to Tel Aviv. In 1984, the company started cutting operations in Botswana. He was appreciated for employing hundreds of Israelis and his positive contribution to the economy of Israel. In 1999, Schachter pioneered the business of branded diamonds introducing their flagship diamond labelled 'The Leo'. Schachter patented his diamond cuts and unique brilliance. In the year 2000, Schachter joined the World Diamond Council and actively took on the World Diamond Congress initiative to source conflict free diamonds through the Kimberley process. The Schachter and Namdar partnership ended in 2005. In 2007, Schachter entered into a partnership with an Indian company, Kama jewels to produce finished jewelry through its Indian venture Kama Schachter. Schachter with his humble beginnings created the world's largest diamond company that employs 1000 employees across the world in Israel, New York, Botswana, India and Japan. In the business generally known for larger-than-life characters, Schachter generally kept away from the spotlight and stayed under the radar.

== Personal life ==
Born in 1924, Schachter was involved with his father in his diamond business some of which he had learned during his stay in Antwerp. Schachter was married to Shirley and had five daughters, and at one point all five of his sons-in-law were involved in Schachter's business. Two of them Tannenbaum and David Greenberg continued while Eric Austein, who long headed the New York City office, retired few years ago. Schachter was an avid supporter of Zionist and Jewish charitable initiatives. After 6 long decades in diamond industry, Schachter retired from business in 2009. At the time of his death, Schachter was survived by his wife, daughters and dozens of grand children and great-grandchildren.
