= GPR179 =

Protein-coding gene in the species Homo sapiens

Identifiers
- Aliases: GPR179, CSNB1E, GPR158L, GPR158L1, G protein-coupled receptor 179
- External IDs: OMIM: 614515; MGI: 2443409; GeneCards: GPR179

Gene location (Human)
Chr.	Chromosome 17 (human)
Band	17q12	Start	38,324,571 bp
Band	17q12	End	38,343,956 bp

Gene location (Mouse)
Chr.	Chromosome 11 (mouse)
Band	11|11 D	Start	97,222,935 bp
Band	11|11 D	End	97,242,903 bp
RNA expression pattern
Bgee	Human / Mouse (ortholog); Top expressed in: testicle; prefrontal cortex; superior frontal gyrus; sural nerve; primary visual cortex; Brodmann area 9; skeletal muscle tissue; hypothalamus; right frontal lobe; nucleus accumbens / Top expressed in: neural layer of retina; vestibular sensory epithelium; epithelium of lens; hypothalamus; left ventricle; diencephalic nucleus; aortic valve; nucleus of hypothalamus; adrenal gland; islet of Langerhans; More reference expression data
BioGPS	n/a
Gene ontology
Molecular function	G protein-coupled receptor activity; signal transducer activity
Cellular component	integral component of membrane; plasma membrane; membrane
Biological process	G protein-coupled receptor signaling pathway; signal transduction; visual perception; response to stimulus
Sources:Amigo / QuickGO
Orthologs
Databases	NCBI: entry; OMA: entry
Species	Human	Mouse
Entrez	440435	217143
Ensembl	ENSG00000276469; ENSG00000277399	ENSMUSG00000070337
UniProt	Q6PRD1	E9PY61
RefSeq (mRNA)	NM_001004334	NM_001081220; NM_175453
RefSeq (protein)	NP_001004334	NP_001074689
Location (UCSC)	Chr 17: 38.32 – 38.34 Mb	Chr 11: 97.22 – 97.24 Mb
PubMed search
- Wikidata
View/Edit Human	View/Edit Mouse

Probable G-protein coupled receptor 179 is a protein that in humans is encoded by the GPR179 gene.

== Clinical relevance ==
Mutations in this gene have been associated to cases of congenital stationary Night Blindness.
