= GPRC5D =

Protein-coding gene in the species Homo sapiens

Identifiers
- Aliases: GPRC5D, G protein-coupled receptor, class C, group 5, member D, G protein-coupled receptor class C group 5 member D
- External IDs: OMIM: 607437; MGI: 1935037; GeneCards: GPRC5D

Gene location (Human)
| Chr. | Chromosome 12 (human) |
| Band | 12p13.1 | Start | 12,940,575 bp |
| Band | 12p13.1 | End | 12,952,170 bp |

Gene location (Mouse)
| Chr. | Chromosome 6 (mouse) |
| Band | 6|6 G1 | Start | 135,082,989 bp |
| Band | 6|6 G1 | End | 135,095,281 bp |
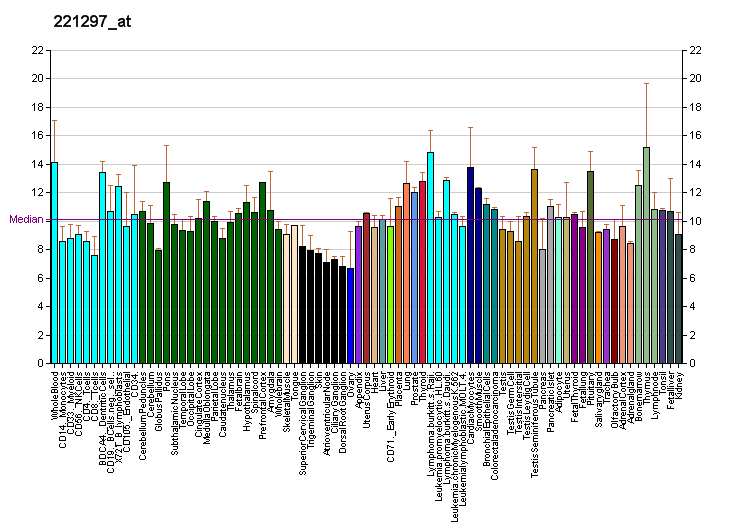
RNA expression pattern
| Bgee | Human / Mouse (ortholog); Top expressed in: testicle; upper lobe of left lung; hair follicle; mucosa of transverse colon; rectum; right lung; minor salivary glands; bone marrow cell; mucosa of esophagus; islet of Langerhans / Top expressed in: lip; blastocyst; embryo; hair follicle; skin of abdomen; embryo; skin of back; dermis; skin of external ear; sexually immature organism; More reference expression data |
| BioGPS | More reference expression data |
Gene ontology
| Molecular function | G protein-coupled receptor activity; signal transducer activity; protein kinase activator activity |
| Cellular component | integral component of membrane; plasma membrane; membrane; receptor complex; intracellular membrane-bounded organelle; extracellular exosome |
| Biological process | G protein-coupled receptor signaling pathway; signal transduction; activation of protein kinase activity |
Sources:Amigo / QuickGO
Orthologs
| Databases | NCBI: entry; OMA: entry |
| Species | Human | Mouse |
| Entrez | 55507 | 93746 |
| Ensembl | ENSG00000111291 | ENSMUSG00000030205 |
| UniProt | Q9NZD1 | Q9JIL6 |
| RefSeq (mRNA) | NM_018654 | NM_001205396; NM_053118 |
| RefSeq (protein) | NP_061124 | NP_001192325; NP_444348 |
| Location (UCSC) | Chr 12: 12.94 – 12.95 Mb | Chr 6: 135.08 – 135.1 Mb |
| PubMed search |
- Wikidata
| View/Edit Human | View/Edit Mouse |

G-protein coupled receptor family C group 5 member D is a protein that in humans is encoded by the GPRC5D gene. GPRC5D is a class C orphan G protein-coupled receptor predominantly expressed in multiple myeloma cells and hard keratinized tissues, with low expression in normal human tissues, rendering it an appealing target for multiple myeloma cells.

== Structure ==
Structural analysis of the complex between GPRC5D and talquetamab, a bispecific antibody for the treatment of multiple myeloma, has revealed that GPRC5D exists as a dimer. GPRC5D forms a symmetric dimer via TM4 and TM4/TM5 interactions. The study further demonstrated that only one talquetamab molecule can bind to the dimeric form of GPRC5D. Talquetamab Fab recognizes ECLs and TM3/5/7 of one GPRC5D protomer via six CDRs.

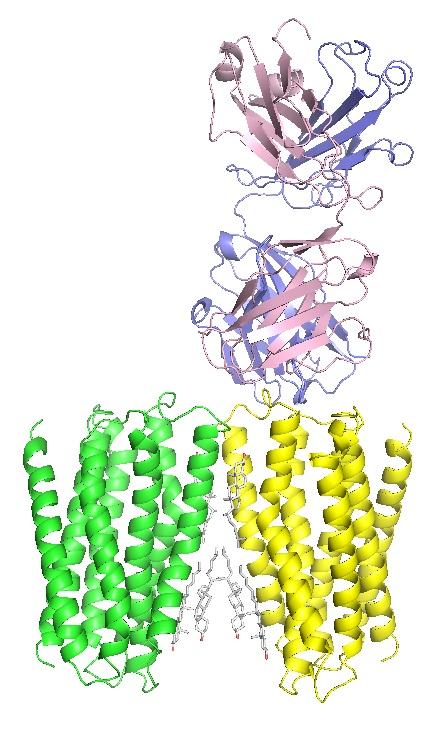
GPRC5D complexed with Talquetamab Fab (PDB: 9IMA)

== Function ==
The protein encoded by this gene is a member of the G protein-coupled receptor family; however, the specific function of this gene has not yet been determined.

== See also ==
- Retinoic acid-inducible orphan G protein-coupled receptor
