= GPRC5A =

Protein-coding gene in the species Homo sapiens

Identifiers
- Aliases: GPRC5A, GPCR5A, RAI3, RAIG1, PEIG-1, TIG1, G protein-coupled receptor class C group 5 member A
- External IDs: OMIM: 604138; MGI: 1891250; GeneCards: GPRC5A

Gene location (Human)
Chr.	Chromosome 12 (human)
Band	12p13.1	Start	12,891,559 bp
Band	12p13.1	End	12,917,937 bp

Gene location (Mouse)
Chr.	Chromosome 6 (mouse)
Band	6|6 G1	Start	135,042,649 bp
Band	6|6 G1	End	135,061,707 bp
RNA expression pattern
Bgee	Human / Mouse (ortholog); Top expressed in: amniotic fluid; lower lobe of lung; mucosa of sigmoid colon; right lung; upper lobe of lung; upper lobe of left lung; mucosa of urinary bladder; visceral pleura; cartilage tissue; rectum / Top expressed in: right lung lobe; left lung lobe; large intestine; colon; epithelium of stomach; left colon; blastocyst; tail of embryo; renal calyx; morula; More reference expression data
BioGPS	n/a
Gene ontology
Molecular function	G protein-coupled receptor activity; protein binding; signal transducer activity; cadherin binding; protein kinase activator activity
Cellular component	integral component of membrane; plasma membrane; integral component of plasma membrane; extracellular exosome; cytoplasmic vesicle membrane; intracellular membrane-bounded organelle; membrane; cytoplasmic vesicle; vesicle; nucleolus; receptor complex
Biological process	negative regulation of epidermal growth factor-activated receptor activity; G protein-coupled receptor signaling pathway; signal transduction; activation of protein kinase activity
Sources:Amigo / QuickGO
Orthologs
Databases	NCBI: entry; OMA: entry
Species	Human	Mouse
Entrez	9052	232431
Ensembl	ENSG00000013588	ENSMUSG00000046733
UniProt	Q8NFJ5	Q8BHL4
RefSeq (mRNA)	NM_003979	NM_181444
RefSeq (protein)	NP_003970	NP_852109
Location (UCSC)	Chr 12: 12.89 – 12.92 Mb	Chr 6: 135.04 – 135.06 Mb
PubMed search
- Wikidata
View/Edit Human	View/Edit Mouse

Retinoic acid-induced protein 3 is a protein that in humans is encoded by the GPRC5A gene. This gene and its encoded mRNA was first identified as a phorbol ester-induced gene, and named Phorbol Ester Induced Gen 1 (PEIG-1); two years later it was rediscovered as a retinoic acid-inducible gene, and named Retinoic Acid-Inducible Gene 1 (RAIG1). Its encoded protein was later named Retinoic acid-induced protein 3.

== Function ==
This gene encodes a member of the type 3 G protein-coupled receptor family, characterized by the signature 7-transmembrane domain motif. The encoded protein may be involved in interaction between retinoic acid and G protein signalling pathways. Retinoic acid plays an important role in development, cellular growth, and differentiation. This gene may play a role in embryonic development and epithelial cell differentiation. Tryptamine and other indole related chemicals produced by gut microflora bind and activate the receptor.

== Post transcriptional regulation ==
GPRC5A is one of only a handful of genes known in the literature that are post-transcriptionally controlled by miRNAs through their 5'UTR.

== Clinical significance ==
GPRC5A is dysregulated in many human cancers and in other diseases.

== See also ==
- Retinoic acid-inducible orphan G protein-coupled receptor
