= Monoclonal antibody therapy =

Form of immunotherapy

Each antibody binds only one specific antigen.

Monoclonal antibodies (mAbs) have varied therapeutic uses. It is possible to create a mAb that binds specifically to almost any extracellular target, such as cell surface proteins and cytokines. They can be used to render their target ineffective (e.g. by preventing receptor binding), to induce a specific cell signal (by activating receptors), to cause the immune system to attack specific cells, or to bring a drug to a specific cell type (such as with radioimmunotherapy which delivers cytotoxic radiation).

Major applications include cancer, autoimmune diseases, asthma, organ transplants, blood clot prevention, and certain infections.

== Antibody structure and function ==
Immunoglobulin G (IgG) antibodies are large heterodimeric molecules, approximately 150 kDa and are composed of two kinds of polypeptide chain, called the heavy (~50kDa) and the light chain (~25kDa). The two types of light chains are kappa (κ) and lambda (λ). By cleavage with enzyme papain, the Fab (fragment-antigen binding) part can be separated from the Fc (fragment crystallizable region) part of the molecule. The Fab fragments contain the variable domains, which consist of three antibody hypervariable amino acid domains responsible for the antibody specificity embedded into constant regions. The four known IgG subclasses are involved in antibody-dependent cellular cytotoxicity. Antibodies are a key component of the adaptive immune response, playing a central role in both in the recognition of foreign antigens and the stimulation of an immune response to them. The advent of monoclonal antibody technology has made it possible to raise antibodies against specific antigens presented on the surfaces of tumors. Monoclonal antibodies can be acquired in the immune system via passive immunity or active immunity. The advantage of active monoclonal antibody therapy is the fact that the immune system will produce antibodies long-term, with only a short-term drug administration to induce this response. However, the immune response to certain antigens may be inadequate, especially in the elderly. Additionally, adverse reactions from these antibodies may occur because of long-lasting response to antigens. Passive monoclonal antibody therapy can ensure consistent antibody concentration, and can control for adverse reactions by stopping administration. However, the repeated administration and consequent higher cost for this therapy are major disadvantages.

Monoclonal antibody therapy may prove to be beneficial for cancer, autoimmune diseases, and neurological disorders that result in the degeneration of body cells, such as Alzheimer's disease. Monoclonal antibody therapy can aid the immune system because the innate immune system responds to the environmental factors it encounters by discriminating against foreign cells from cells of the body. Therefore, tumor cells that are proliferating at high rates, or body cells that are dying which subsequently cause physiological problems are generally not specifically targeted by the immune system, since tumor cells are the patient's own cells. Tumor cells, however are highly abnormal, and many display unusual antigens. Some such tumor antigens are inappropriate for the cell type or its environment. Monoclonal antibodies can target and mark tumor cells or abnormal cells in the body that are recognized as body cells.

== History ==
Monoclonal antibodies for cancer. ADEPT: antibody directed enzyme prodrug therapy; ADCC: antibody-dependent cell-mediated cytotoxicity; CDC: complement-dependent cytotoxicity; MAb, monoclonal antibody; scFv, single-chain Fv fragment.

Immunotherapy developed in the 1970s following the discovery of the structure of antibodies and the development of hybridoma technology, which provided the first reliable source of monoclonal antibodies. These advances allowed for the specific targeting of tumors both in vitro and in vivo. Initial research on malignant neoplasms found mAb therapy of limited and generally short-lived success with blood malignancies. Treatment also had to be tailored to each individual patient, which was impracticable in routine clinical settings.

Four major antibody types that have been developed are murine, chimeric, humanised and human. Antibodies of each type are distinguished by suffixes on their name.

=== Murine ===
Initial therapeutic antibodies were murine analogues (suffix -omab). These antibodies have: a short half-life in vivo (due to immune complex formation), limited penetration into tumour sites and inadequately recruit host effector functions. Chimeric and humanized antibodies have generally replaced them in therapeutic antibody applications. Understanding of proteomics has proven essential in identifying novel tumour targets.

Initially, murine antibodies were obtained by hybridoma technology, for which Jerne, Köhler and Milstein received a Nobel prize. However the dissimilarity between murine and human immune systems led to the clinical failure of these antibodies, except in some specific circumstances. Major problems associated with murine antibodies included reduced stimulation of cytotoxicity and the formation of complexes after repeated administration, which resulted in mild allergic reactions and sometimes anaphylactic shock. Hybridoma technology has been replaced by recombinant DNA technology, transgenic mice and phage display.

=== Chimeric and humanized ===
To reduce murine antibody immunogenicity (attacks by the immune system against the antibody), murine molecules were engineered to remove immunogenic content and to increase immunologic efficiency. This was initially achieved by the production of chimeric (suffix -ximab) and humanized antibodies (suffix -zumab). Chimeric antibodies are composed of murine variable regions fused onto human constant regions. Taking human gene sequences from the kappa light chain and the IgG1 heavy chain results in antibodies that are approximately 65-75% human. This reduces immunogenicity, and thus increases serum half-life as the chimeric or humanized antibody is less likely to be recognized as foreign by the bodies immune system.

Humanised antibodies are produced by grafting murine hypervariable regions on amino acid domains into human antibodies. This results in a molecule of approximately 95% human origin. Humanised antibodies bind antigen much more weakly than the parent murine monoclonal antibody, with reported decreases in affinity of up to several hundredfold. Increases in antibody-antigen binding strength have been achieved by introducing mutations into the complementarity determining regions (CDR), using techniques such as chain-shuffling, randomization of complementarity-determining regions and antibodies with mutations within the variable regions induced by error-prone PCR, E. coli mutator strains and site-specific mutagenesis.

=== Human monoclonal antibodies ===
Human monoclonal antibodies (suffix -umab) are produced using transgenic mice or phage display libraries by transferring human immunoglobulin genes into the murine genome and vaccinating the transgenic mouse against the desired antigen, leading to the production of appropriate monoclonal antibodies. Murine antibodies in vitro are thereby transformed into fully human antibodies.

The heavy and light chains of human IgG proteins are expressed in structural polymorphic (allotypic) forms. Human IgG allotype is one of the many factors that can contribute to immunogenicity.

== Targeted conditions ==
=== Cancer ===
Anti-cancer monoclonal antibodies can be targeted against malignant cells by several mechanisms. Ramucirumab is a recombinant human monoclonal antibody and is used in the treatment of advanced malignancies. In childhood lymphoma, phase I and II studies have found a positive effect of using antibody therapy.

Monoclonal antibodies used to boost an anticancer immune response is another strategy to fight cancer where cancer cells are not targeted directly. Strategies include antibodies engineered to block mechanisms which downregulate anticancer immune responses, checkpoints such as PD-1 and CTLA-4 (checkpoint therapy), and antibodies modified to stimulate activation of immune cells.

=== Autoimmune diseases ===
Monoclonal antibodies used for autoimmune diseases include infliximab and adalimumab, which are effective in rheumatoid arthritis, Crohn's disease and ulcerative colitis by their ability to bind to and inhibit TNF-α. Basiliximab and daclizumab inhibit IL-2 on activated T cells and thereby help preventing acute rejection of kidney transplants. Omalizumab inhibits human immunoglobulin E (IgE) and is useful in moderate-to-severe allergic asthma.

=== Alzheimer's disease ===
Alzheimer's disease (AD) is a multi-faceted, age-dependent, progressive neurodegenerative disorder, and is a major cause of dementia. According to the Amyloid hypothesis, the accumulation of extracellular amyloid beta peptides (Aβ) into plaques via oligomerization leads to hallmark symptomatic conditions of AD through synaptic dysfunction and neurodegeneration. Immunotherapy via exogenous monoclonal antibody (mAb) administration has been known to treat various central nervous disorders. In the case of AD, immunotherapy is believed to inhibit Aβ-oligomerization or clearing of Aβ from the brain and thereby prevent neurotoxicity.

However, mAbs are large molecules and due to the blood–brain barrier, uptake of mAb into the brain is extremely limited, only approximately 1 of 1000 mAb molecules is estimated to pass. However, the Peripheral Sink hypothesis proposes a mechanism where mAbs may not need to cross the blood–brain barrier. Therefore, many research studies are being conducted from failed attempts to treat AD in the past.

However, anti-Aβ vaccines can promote antibody-mediated clearance of Aβ plaques in transgenic mice models with amyloid precursor proteins (APP), and can reduce cognitive impairments. Vaccines can stimulate the immune system to produce its own antibodies, in the case of Alzheimer's disease by administration of the antigen Aβ. This is also known as active immunotherapy. Another strategy is so called passive immunotherapy. In this case the antibodies is produced externally in cultured cells and are delivered to the patient in the form of a drug. In mice expressing APP, both active and passive immunization of anti-Aβ antibodies has been shown to be effective in clearing plaques, and can improve cognitive function.

Currently, there are two FDA approved antibody therapies for Alzheimer's disease, Aducanemab and Lecanemab. Aducanemab has received accelerated approval while Lecanemab has received full approval. Several clinical trials using passive and active immunization have been performed and some are on the way with expected results in a couple of years. The implementation of these drugs is often during the early onset of AD. One trial testing Foralumab seeks to determine if there is benefit in later stages of AD by reduction of brain inflammation. Other research and drug development for early intervention and AD prevention is ongoing. Examples of important mAb drugs that have been or are under evaluation for treatment of AD include Bapineuzumab, Solanezumab, Gautenerumab, Crenezumab, Aducanemab, Lecanemab and Donanemab.

==== Bapineuzumab ====
Bapineuzumab, a humanized anti-Aβ mAb, is directed against the N-terminus of Aβ. Phase II clinical trials of Bapineuzumab in mild to moderate AD patients resulted in reduced Aβ concentration in the brain. However, in patients with increased apolipoprotein (APOE) e4 carriers, Bapineuzumab treatment is also accompanied by vasogenic edema, a cytotoxic condition where the blood brain barrier has been disrupted thereby affecting white matter from excess accumulation of fluid from capillaries in intracellular and extracellular spaces of the brain.

In Phase III clinical trials, Bapineuzumab showed promising positive effect on biomarkers of AD but failed to show effect on cognitive decline. Therefore, Bapineuzumab was discontinued after failing in the Phase III clinical trial.

==== Solanezumab ====
Solanezumab, an anti-Aβ mAb, targets the N-terminus of Aβ. In Phase I and Phase II of clinical trials, Solanezumab treatment resulted in cerebrospinal fluid elevation of Aβ, thereby showing a reduced concentration of Aβ plaques. Additionally, there are no associated adverse side effects. Phase III clinical trials of Solanezumab brought about significant reduction in cognitive impairment in patients with mild AD, but not in patients with severe AD. However, Aβ concentration did not significantly change, along with other AD biomarkers, including phospho-tau expression, and hippocampal volume. Phase III clinical trials of Solanezumab failed as it did not show effect on cognitive decline in comparison to placebo.

==== Lecanemab ====
Lecanemab (BAN2401), is a humanized mAb that selectively targets toxic soluble Aβ protofibrils, In phase 3 clinical trials, Lecanemab showed a 27% slower cognitive decline after 18 months of treatment in comparison to placebo. The phase 3 clinical trials also reported infusion related reactions, amyloid-related imaging abnormalities and headaches as the most common side effects of Lecanemab. In July 2023 the FDA gave Lecanemab full approval for the treatment of Alzheimer's Disease and it was given the commercial name Leqembi.

==== Preventive trials ====
Failure of several drugs in Phase III clinical trials has led to AD prevention and early intervention for onset AD treatment endeavours. Passive anti-Aβ mAb treatment can be used for preventive attempts to modify AD progression before it causes extensive brain damage and symptoms. Trials using mAb treatment for patients positive for genetic risk factors, and elderly patients positive for indicators of AD are underway. This includes anti-AB treatment in Asymptomatic Alzheimer's Disease (A4), the Alzheimer's Prevention Initiative (API), and DIAN-TU. The A4 study on older individuals who are positive for indicators of AD but are negative for genetic risk factors will test Solanezumab in Phase III Clinical Trials, as a follow-up of previous Solanezumab studies. DIAN-TU, launched in December 2012, focuses on young patients positive for genetic mutations that are risks for AD. This study uses Solanezumab and Gautenerumab. Gautenerumab, the first fully human MAB that preferentially interacts with oligomerized Aβ plaques in the brain, caused significant reduction in Aβ concentration in Phase I clinical trials, preventing plaque formation and concentration without altering plasma concentration of the brain. Phase II and III clinical trials are currently being conducted.

== Therapy types ==
=== Radioimmunotherapy ===
Radioimmunotherapy (RIT) involves the use of radioactively-conjugated murine antibodies against cellular antigens. Most research involves their application to lymphomas, as these are highly radio-sensitive malignancies. To limit radiation exposure, murine antibodies were chosen, as their high immunogenicity promotes rapid tumor clearance. Tositumomab is an example used for non-Hodgkin's lymphoma.

=== Antibody-directed enzyme prodrug therapy ===
Antibody-directed enzyme prodrug therapy (ADEPT) involves the application of cancer-associated monoclonal antibodies that are linked to a drug-activating enzyme. Systemic administration of a non-toxic agent results in the antibody's conversion to a toxic drug, resulting in a cytotoxic effect that can be targeted at malignant cells. The clinical success of ADEPT treatments is limited.

=== Antibody-drug conjugates ===
Antibody-drug conjugates (ADCs) are antibodies linked to one or more drug molecules. Typically when the ADC meets the target cell (e.g. a cancerous cell) the drug is released to kill it. Many ADCs are in clinical development. As of 2016 a few have been approved.

=== Immunoliposome therapy ===
Immunoliposomes are antibody-conjugated liposomes. Liposomes can carry drugs or therapeutic nucleotides and when conjugated with monoclonal antibodies, may be directed against malignant cells. Immunoliposomes have been successfully used in vivo to convey tumour-suppressing genes into tumours, using an antibody fragment against the human transferrin receptor. Tissue-specific gene delivery using immunoliposomes has been achieved in brain and breast cancer tissue.

=== Checkpoint therapy ===
Checkpoint therapy uses antibodies and other techniques to circumvent the defenses that tumors use to suppress the immune system. Each defense is known as a checkpoint. Compound therapies combine antibodies to suppress multiple defensive layers. Known checkpoints include CTLA-4 targeted by ipilimumab, PD-1 targeted by nivolumab and pembrolizumab and the tumor microenvironment.

The tumor microenvironment (TME) features prevents the recruitment of T cells to the tumor. Ways include chemokine CCL^{2} nitration, which traps T cells in the stroma. Tumor vasculature helps tumors preferentially recruit other immune cells over T cells, in part through endothelial cell (EC)–specific expression of FasL, ET_{B}R, and B7H3. Myelomonocytic and tumor cells can up-regulate expression of PD-L1, partly driven by hypoxic conditions and cytokine production, such as IFNβ. Aberrant metabolite production in the TME, such as the pathway regulation by IDO, can affect T cell functions directly and indirectly via cells such as T_{reg} cells. CD8 cells can be suppressed by B cells regulation of TAM phenotypes. Cancer-associated fibroblasts (CAFs) have multiple TME functions, in part through extracellular matrix (ECM)–mediated T cell trapping and CXCL12-regulated T cell exclusion.

== FDA-approved therapeutic antibodies ==
The first FDA-approved therapeutic monoclonal antibody was a murine IgG2a CD3 specific transplant rejection drug, OKT3 (also called muromonab), in 1986. This drug found use in solid organ transplant recipients who became steroid resistant. Hundreds of therapies are undergoing clinical trials. As of 2025, there were over 200 antibodies approved by the FDA, with about 40% of them targeting oncological targets and 35% for autoimmune and inflammatory diseases. The majority of these are conventional antibodies which make up over 70% of FDA approved antibodies. Most are part of the IgG1 subclass, again making up over 70% of antibodies.

FDA approved therapeutic monoclonal antibodies
Antibody	Brand name	Company	Approval date	Route	Type	Target	Indication (Targeted disease)	BLA STN	Drug Label
abciximab	ReoPro	Centocor	12/22/1994	intravenous	chimeric Fab	GPIIb/IIIa	percutaneous coronary intervention	103575	Link
adalimumab	Humira	Abbvie	12/31/2002	subcutaneous	fully human	TNF	rheumatoid arthritis	125057	Link
adalimumab-adbm	Cyltezo	Boehringer Ingelheim	8/25/2017	subcutaneous	fully human, biosimilar	TNF	rheumatoid arthritis juvenile idiopathic arthritis psoriatic arthritis ankylosing spondylitis Crohn's disease ulcerative colitis plaque psoriasis	761058	Link
adalimumab-atto	Amjevita	Amgen	9/23/2016	subcutaneous	fully human, biosimilar	TNF	rheumatoid arthritis juvenile idiopathic arthritis psoriatic arthritis ankylosing spondylitis Crohn's disease ulcerative colitis plaque psoriasis	761024	Link
ado-trastuzumab emtansine	Kadcyla	Genentech	2/22/2013	intravenous	humanized, antibody-drug conjugate	HER2	metastatic breast cancer	125427	Link
aducanumab	Aduhelm	Biogen	6/7/2021	intravenous	fully human	amyloid-β	early stage Alzheimer's disease	761178	
alemtuzumab	Campath, Lemtrada	Genzyme	5/7/2001	intravenous	humanized	CD52	B-cell chronic lymphocytic leukemia	103948	Link
alirocumab	Praluent	Sanofi Aventis	7/24/2015	subcutaneous	fully human	PCSK9	heterozygous familial hypercholesterolemia refractory hypercholesterolemia	125559	Link
amivantamab	Rybrevant	Janssen Biotech	5/21/2021	intravenous	fully human	EGFR, cMET	non-small cell lung cancer with epidermal growth factor receptor exon 20 insertion mutations	761210	Link
anifrolumab	Saphnelo	AstraZeneca	7/30/2021	intravenous (2021) subcutaneous (2026)	fully human	IFN-α/β receptor	systemic lupus erythematosus	761123 761451	
ansuvimab	Ebanga	Emergent BioDefense Operations Lansing (now Emergent Biosolutions)	12/21/2020	intravenous	fully human	Ebola virus glycoprotein	treatment of Zaire ebolavirus (Ebola virus)	761172	
apitegromab	Isembyld	Scholar Rock	9/11/2026	intravenous	fully human	SMN2	spinal muscular atrophy		
atezolizumab	Tecentriq	Genentech	5/18/2016	intravenous	humanized	PD-L1	urothelial carcinoma	761034	Link
atoltivimab/maftivimab/odesivimab	Inmazeb	Regeneron	10/14/2020	intravenous	fully human	Ebola virus glycoprotein	treatment of Zaire ebolavirus (Ebola virus)	761169	
avelumab	Bavencio	EMD Serono	3/23/2017	intravenous	fully human	PD-L1	metastatic Merkel cell carcinoma	761049	Link
axatilimab	Niktimvo	Incyte	8/14/2024	intravenous	humanized	CSF-1R	chronic graft-versus-host disease	761411	Link
basiliximab	Simulect	Novartis	5/12/1998	intravenous	chimeric	IL-2RA	prophylaxis of acute organ rejection in renal transplant	103764	Link
belantamab mafodotin	Blenrep	GlaxoSmithKline	8/5/2020	intravenous	humanized	B-cell maturation antigen	multiple myeloma	761158	Link
belimumab	Benlysta	Human Genome Sciences	3/9/2011	intravenous	fully human	BLyS	systemic lupus erythematosus	125370	Link
benralizumab	Fasenra	AstraZeneca	11/14/2017	subcutaneous	humanized	interleukin-5 receptor alpha subunit	severe asthmaeosinophilic phenotype	761070	Link
bevacizumab	Avastin	Genentech	2/26/2004	intravenous	humanized	VEGF	Metastatic colorectal cancer	125085	Link
bevacizumab-awwb	Mvasi	Amgen	9/14/2017	intravenous	humanized, biosimilar	VEGF	metastatic colorectal cancer non-squamous Non-small-cell lung carcinoma glioblastoma metastatic renal cell carcinoma cervical cancer	761028	Link
bezlotoxumab	Zinplava	Merck	10/21/2016	intravenous	fully human	Clostridioides difficile toxin B	prevent recurrence of Clostridioides difficile infection	761046	Link
bimekizumab	Bimzelx	UCB	10/17/2023	subcutaneous	humanized	IL-17A, IL-17F, IL-17AF	psoriasis	761151	
blinatumomab	Blincyto	Amgen	12/3/2014	intravenous	mouse, bispecific	CD19	precursor B-cell acute lymphoblastic leukemia	125557	Link
brentuximab vedotin	Adcetris	Seattle Genetics	9/19/2011	intravenous	chimeric, antibody-drug conjugate	CD30	Hodgkin lymphoma anaplastic large-cell lymphoma	125388	Link
brodalumab	Siliq	Valeant	2/15/2017	subcutaneous	chimeric	IL-17RA	plaque psoriasis	761032	Link
brolucizumab	Beovu	Novartis	10/7/2019	intravitreal	humanized	VEGF-A	wet age-related macular degeneration	761125	
burosumab	Crysvita	Ultragenyx	4/17/2018	subcutaneous	fully human	FGF23	X-linked hypophosphatemia	761068	Link
canakinumab	Ilaris	Novartis	6/17/2009	subcutaneous	fully human	IL1B	cryopyrin-associated periodic syndrome	125319	Link
caplacizumab	Cablivi	Ablynx	2/6/2019	intravenous subcutaneous	humanized	VWF	thrombotic thrombocytopenic purpura thrombosis	761112	
capromab pendetide	ProstaScint	Cytogen	10/28/1996	intravenous	murine, radiolabeled	PSMA	diagnostic imaging agent in newly diagnosed prostate cancer or post-prostatectomy	103608	Link
cemiplimab	Libtayo	Regeneron	9/28/2018	intravenous	fully human	PD-1	cutaneous squamous cell carcinoma	761097	
certolizumab pegol	Cimzia	UCB	4/22/2008	subcutaneous	humanized	TNF	Crohn's disease	125160	Link
cetuximab	Erbitux	ImClone Systems	2/12/2004	intravenous	chimeric	EGFR	Metastatic colorectal carcinoma	125084	Link
clesrovimab	Enflonsia	Merck	6/9/2025	intramuscular	fully human	respiratory syncytial virus F protein	respiratory syncytial virus (prevention)	761432	
concizumab	Alhemo	Novo Nordisk	12/20/2024	subcutaneous	humanized	tissue factor pathway inhibitor	bleeding with hemophilia	761315	
cosibelimab	Unloxcyt	Sun Pharma	12/13/2024	intravenous	fully human	PD-L1	cutaneous squamous cell carcinoma	761297	
crizanlizumab	Adakveo	Novartis	11/15/2019	intravenous	humanized	P selectin	sickle-cell disease	761128	
crovalimab	Piasky	Genentech	6/20/2024	intravenous subcutaneous	humanized	C5	paroxysmal nocturnal hemoglobinuria	761388	Link
daclizumab	Zenapax	Roche	12/10/1997	intravenous	humanized	IL-2RA	prophylaxis of acute organ rejection in renal transplant	103749	Link
daclizumab	Zinbryta	Biogen	5/27/2016	subcutaneous	humanized	IL-2R	multiple sclerosis	761029	Link
daratumumab	Darzalex	Janssen Biotech	11/16/2015	intravenous	fully human	CD38	multiple myeloma	761036	Link
denosumab	Prolia, Xgeva	Amgen	6/1/2010	subcutaneous	fully human	RANKL	postmenopausal women with osteoporosis	125320	Link
depemokimab	Exdensur	GlaxoSmithKline	12/16/2025	subcutaneous	humanized	IL-5	asthma	761458	
dinutuximab	Unituxin	United Therapeutics	3/10/2015	intravenous	chimeric	GD2	pediatric high-risk neuroblastoma	125516	Link
donanemab	Kisunla	Eli Lilly	7/2/2024	intravenous	humanized	amyloid-β	Alzheimer's patients with mild cognitive impairment	761248	Link
dostarlimab	Jemperli	GlaxoSmithKline	4/22/2021	intravenous	humanized	PD-1	endometrial cancer	761174	Link
dupilumab	Dupixent	Regeneron Pharmaceuticals	3/28/2017	subcutaneous	fully human	IL-4RA	atopic dermatitis asthma	761055	Link
durvalumab	Imfinzi	AstraZeneca	5/1/2017	intravenous	fully human	PD-L1	urothelial carcinoma	761069	Link
eculizumab	Soliris	Alexion	3/16/2007	intravenous	humanized	Complement component 5	paroxysmal nocturnal hemoglobinuria neuromyelitis optica spectrum disorder generalized myasthenia gravis atypical hemolytic uremic syndrome	125166	Link
elotuzumab	Empliciti	Bristol-Myers Squibb	11/30/2015	intravenous	humanized	SLAMF7	multiple myeloma	761035	Link
emapalumab	Gamifant	Swedish Orphan Biovitrum AB	11/20/2018	intravenous	fully human	IFN-γ	hemophagocytic lymphohistiocytosis	761107	
emicizumab	Hemlibra	Genentech	11/16/2017	subcutaneous	humanized, bispecific	Factor IXa, Factor X	hemophilia A (congenital Factor VIII deficiency) with Factor VIII inhibitors	761083	Link
enfortumab vedotin	Padcev	Astellas Pharma	12/18/2019	intravenous	fully human	nectin-4	urothelial cancer	761137	
epcoritamab	Epkinly	Genmab	5/19/2023	subcutaneous	humanized	CD3, CD20	diffuse large B-cell lymphoma	761324	
eptinezumab	Vyepti	Lundbeck Seattle BioPharmaceuticals	2/21/2020	intravenous	humanized	calcitonin gene-related peptide	migraine	761119	
erenumab	Aimovig	Amgen	5/17/2018	subcutaneous	fully human	CGRP receptor	migraine prevention	761077	Link
evinacumab	Evkeeza	Regeneron	2/11/2021	intravenous	fully human	angiopoietin 3	dyslipidemia	761181	
evolocumab	Repatha	Amgen	8/27/2015	subcutaneous	fully human	PCSK9	heterozygous familial hypercholesterolemia refractory hypercholesterolemia	125522	Link
faricimab	Vabysmo	Genentech	1/28/2022	intravitreal	humanized	VEGF-A, Ang-2	angiogenesis, ocular vascular diseases	761235	
fremanezumab	Ajovy	Teva	9/14/2018	subcutaneous	humanized	calcitonin gene-related peptide alpha and beta	migraine	761089	
galcanezumab	Emgality	Eli Lilly	9/27/2018	subcutaneous	humanized	calcitonin	migraine	761063	
garadacimab	Andembry	CSL Behring	6/16/2025	subcutaneous	fully human	Coagulation factor XIIa	hereditary angioedema	761367	
garetosmab	Pasatru	Regeneron	8/19/2026	intravenous	fully human	Activin-A	fibrodysplasia ossificans progressiva	761508	
gemtuzumab ozogamicin	Mylotarg	Wyeth	9/1/2017	intravenous	humanized, antibody-drug conjugate	CD33	acute myeloid leukemia	761060	Link
glofitamab	Columvi	Genentech	6/15/2023	intravenous	humanized	CD20, CD3	diffuse large B-cell lymphoma	761309	
golimumab	Simponi	Centocor	4/24/2009	subcutaneous	fully human	TNF	rheumatoid arthritis psoriatic arthritis ankylosing spondylitis	125289	Link
golimumab	Simponi Aria	Janssen Biotech	7/18/2013	intravenous	fully human	TNF	rheumatoid arthritis	125433	Link
guselkumab	Tremfya	Janssen Biotech	7/13/2017	subcutaneous	fully human	IL-23	plaque psoriasis	761061	Link
ibalizumab	Trogarzo	TaiMed Biologics	3/6/2018	intravenous	humanized	CD4	HIV	761065	Link
ibritumomab tiuxetan	Zevalin	Spectrum Pharmaceuticals	2/19/2002	intravenous	murine, radioimmunotherapy	CD20	relapsed or refractory low-grade follicular or transformed B-cell non-Hodgkin's lymphoma	125019	Link
idarucizumab	Praxbind	Boehringer Ingelheim	10/16/2015	intravenous	humanized Fab	dabigatran	emergency reversal of anticoagulant dabigatran	761025	Link
inebilizumab	Uplizna	Horizon Therapeutics	6/11/2020	intravenous	humanized	CD19	cancer systemic sclerosis multiple sclerosis	761142	
infliximab	Remicade	Centocor	8/24/1998	intravenous	chimeric	TNF alpha	Crohn's disease	103772	Link
infliximab-abda	Renflexis	Samsung Bioepis	4/21/2017	intravenous	chimeric, biosimilar	TNF	Crohn's disease ulcerative colitis rheumatoid arthritis ankylosing spondylitis psoriatic arthritis plaque psoriasis	761054	Link
infliximab-dyyb	Inflectra	Celltrion Healthcare	4/5/2016	intravenous	chimeric, biosimilar	TNF	Crohn's disease ulcerative colitis rheumatoid arthritis ankylosing spondylitis psoriatic arthritis plaque psoriasis	125544	Link
infliximab-qbtx	Ixifi	Pfizer	12/13/2017	intravenous	chimeric, biosimilar	TNF	Crohn's disease ulcerative colitis rheumatoid arthritis ankylosing spondylitis psoriatic arthritis plaque psoriasis	761072	Link
inotuzumab ozogamicin	Besponsa	Wyeth	8/17/2017	intravenous	humanized, antibody-drug conjugate	CD22	precursor B-cell acute lymphoblastic leukemia	761040	Link
ipilimumab	Yervoy	Bristol-Myers Squibb	3/25/2011	intravenous	fully human	CTLA-4	metastatic melanoma	125377	Link
isatuximab	Sarclisa	Sanofi Aventis	3/2/2020	intravenous	chimeric	CD38	multiple myeloma	761113	Link
ixekizumab	Taltz	Eli Lilly	3/22/2016	subcutaneous	humanized	IL-17A	plaque psoriasis	125521	Link
lanadelumab	Takhzyro	Takeda	8/23/2018	subcutaneous	fully human	kallikrein	angioedema	761090	
lebrikizumab	Ebglyss	Eli Lilly	9/13/2024	subcutaneous	humanized	IL-13	Moderate-to-severe atopic dermatitis	761306	
lecanemab	Leqembi	Eisai	1/6/2023	intravenous (2023) subcutaneous (2025)	humanized	β-amyloid	Alzheimer's disease	761269 761375	
loncastuximab tesirine	Zynlonta	ADC Therapeutics	4/23/2021	intravenous	humanized	CD19	diffuse large B-cell lymphoma	761196	Link
linvoseltamab	Lynozyfic	Regeneron	7/2/2025	intravenous	fully human	CD3, B-cell maturation antigen	multiple myeloma	761400	
margetuximab	Margenza	MacroGenics	12/16/2020	intravenous	humanized	HER-2	breast cancer	761150	
marstacimab	Hympavzi	Pfizer	10/11/2024	intravenous	fully human	Tissue factor pathway inhibitor	hemophilia A and B	761369	Link
mepolizumab	Nucala	GlaxoSmithKline	11/4/2015	subcutaneous	humanized	IL-5	severe asthma	125526	Link
mirikizumab	Omvoh	Eli Lilly	10/26/2023	intravenous subcutaneous	humanized	IL-23	ulcerative colitis	761279	
mirvetuximab soravtansine	Elahere	ImmunoGen	11/14/2022	intravenous	chimeric	folate receptor alpha	ovarian cancer	761310	
mogamulizumab	Poteligeo	Kyowa Kirin	8/8/2018	intravenous	humanized	CCR4	adult T-cell leukemia/lymphoma	761051	
mosunetuzumab	Lunsumio	Genentech	12/22/2022	intravenous subcutaneous	humanized	CD3E, MS4A1, CD20	follicular lymphoma	761263	
moxetumomab pasudotox	Lumoxiti	AstraZeneca	9/13/2018	intravenous	murine	CD22	hairy cell leukemia	761104	
narsoplimab	Yartemlea	Omeros Corporation	12/23/2025	intravenous	fully human	mannan-binding lectin-associated serine protease-2	thrombotic microangiopathy	761152	
natalizumab	Tysabri	Biogen Idec	11/23/2004	intravenous	humanized	alpha-4 integrin	multiple sclerosis	125104	Link
naxitamab	Danyelza	Y-mABs Therapeutics	11/25/2020	intravenous	humanized	GD2	high-risk neuroblastoma and chronic refactory osetomyelitis	761171	Link
necitumumab	Portrazza	Eli Lilly	11/24/2015	intravenous	fully human	EGFR	metastatic squamous non-small cell lung carcinoma	125547	Link
nemolizumab	Nemluvio	Galderma	8/12/2024	subcutaneous	humanized	IL-31	prurigo nodularis	761390	Link
nipocalimab	Imaavy	Janssen Biotech	4/29/2025	intravenous	fully human	Neonatal fragment crystallizable receptor	generalized myasthenia gravis Sjögren's disease	761430	
nivolumab	Opdivo	Bristol-Myers Squibb	3/4/2015	intravenous	fully human	PD-1	metastatic squamous non-small cell lung carcinoma metastatic melanoma	125527	Link
obiltoxaximab	Anthim	Elusys Therapeutics	3/18/2016	intravenous	chimeric	Protective antigen of the Anthrax toxin	inhalational anthrax	125509	Link
obinutuzumab	Gazyva	Genentech	11/1/2013	intravenous	humanized	CD20	chronic lymphocytic leukemia	125486	Link
ocrelizumab	Ocrevus	Genentech	3/28/2017	intravenous	humanized	CD20	multiple sclerosis	761053	Link
ofatumumab	Arzerra	Glaxo Grp	10/26/2009	intravenous	fully human	CD20	chronic lymphocytic leukemia	125326	Link
olaratumab	Lartruvo	Eli Lilly	10/19/2016	intravenous	fully human	PDGFRA	roft tissue sarcoma	761038	Link
omalizumab	Xolair	Genentech	6/20/2003	subcutaneous	humanized	IgE	moderate to severe persistent asthma	103976	Link
palivizumab	Synagis	MedImmune	6/19/1998	intramuscular	humanized	F protein of RSV	respiratory syncytial virus	103770	Link
panitumumab	Vectibix	Amgen	9/27/2006	intravenous	fully human	EGFR	metastatic colorectal cancer	125147	Link
pembrolizumab	Keytruda	Merck	9/4/2014	intravenous	humanized	PD-1	metastatic melanoma	125514	Link
penpulimab	N/A	Akeso Biopharma	4/23/2025	intravenous	humanized	PD-1	advanced or recurrent nasopharyngeal carcinoa	761258	
pertuzumab	Perjeta	Genentech	6/8/2012	intravenous	humanized	HER2	metastatic breast cancer	125409	Link
pivekimab sunirine	Decnupaz	AbbVie	5/27/2026	intravenous	humanized	CD123	blastic plasmacytoid dendritic cell neoplasm	761460	
pozelimab	Veopoz	Regeneron	8/18/2023	intravenous subcutaneous	fully human	C5	CHAPLE disease	761339	
polatuzumab vedotin	Polivy	Genentech	6/10/2019	intravenous	humanized	CD79B	diffuse large B-cell lymphoma	761121	
ramucirumab	Cyramza	Eli Lilly	4/21/2014	intravenous	fully human	VEGFR2	gastric cancer	125477	Link
ranibizumab	Lucentis	Genentech	6/30/2006	intravitreal	humanized	VEGFR1; VEGFR2	wet age-related macular degeneration	125156	Link
ravulizumab	Ultomiris	Alexion	12/21/2018	intravenous	fully human	Complement component 5	paroxysmal nocturnal hemoglobinuria neuromyelitis optica spectrum disorder generalized myasthenia gravis atypical hemolytic uremic syndrome	761108	Link
raxibacumab	Raxibacumab	Human Genome Sciences	12/24/2012	intravenous	fully human	Protective antigen of Bacillus anthracis	inhalational anthrax	125349	Link
reslizumab	Cinqair	Teva	3/23/2016	intravenous	humanized	IL-5	severe asthma	761033	Link
retifanlimab	Zynyz	Incyte	3/22/2023	intravenous	humanized	PD-1	Merkel cell carcinoma	761334	
risankizumab	Skyrizi	AbbVie	4/23/2019	subcutaneous (2019) intravenous (2022)	humanized	IL-23A	Crohn's disease psoriasis psoriatic arthritis asthma	761105 761262	
rituximab	Rituxan	Genentech	11/26/1997	intravenous	chimeric	CD20	B-cell non-Hodgkin's lymphoma	103705	Link
rituximab and hyaluronidase	Rituxan Hycela	Genentech	6/22/2017	subcutaneous	chimeric, co-formulated	CD20	follicular lymphoma diffuse large B-cell lymphoma chronic lymphocytic leukemia	761064	Link
romosozumab	Evenity	Amgen	4/9/2019	subcutaneous	humanized	sclerostin	osteoporosis	761062	
rozanolixizumab	Rystiggo	UCB	6/26/2023	subcutaneous	chimeric/ humanized	FCGRT	myasthenia gravis	761286	
sacituzumab govitecan	Trodelvy	Gilead Sciences	4/22/2020	intravenous	humanized	TROP-2	triple-negative breast cancer	761115	Link
sarilumab	Kevzara	Sanofi Aventis	5/22/2017	subcutaneous	fully human	IL6R	rheumatoid arthritis	761037	Link
satralizumab	Enspryng	Genentech	8/14/2020	subcutaneous	humanized	IL6R	neuromyelitis optica	761149	
secukinumab	Cosentyx	Novartis	1/21/2015	subcutaneous (2015) intravenous (2023)	fully human	IL17A	plaque psoriasis ankylosing spondylitis	125504	Link
sibeprenlimab	Voyxact	Otsuka Pharmaceutical	11/25/2025	subcutaneous	humanized	A proliferation-inducing ligand	immunoglobulin A nephropathy	761434	
siltuximab	Sylvant	Janssen Biotech	4/23/2014	intravenous	chimeric	IL-6	multicentric Castleman's disease	125496	Link
spesolimab	Spevigo	LEO Pharma	9/1/2022	intravenous subcutaneous	humanized	IL1RL2/IL1RAP	generalized pustular psoriasis	761244	
sutimlimab	Enjaymo	Recordati Rare Diseases	2/4/2022	intravenous	chimeric/humanized	complement component 1s (C1s)	cold agglutinin disease	761164	
tafasitamab	Monjuvi	Incyte	7/31/2020	intravenous	humanized	CD19	diffuse large B-cell lymphoma	761163	Link
talquetamab	Talvey	Janssen Biotech	8/9/2023	subcutaneous	humanized	GPRC5D, CD3	relapsed or refractory multiple myeloma	761342	
tarlatamab	Imdelltra	Amgen	5/16/2024	intravenous	humanized, bispecific	DLL3, CD3	small cell lung cancer with disease progression on or after platinum-based chemotherapy	761344	Link
teclistamab	Tecvayli	Janssen Biotech	10/25/2022	subcutaneous	humanized	B-cell maturation antigen (BCMA), CD3	relapsed or refractory multiple myeloma	761291	
teplizumab	Tzield	Provention Bio	11/17/2022	intravenous	humanized	CD3	diabetes mellitus type 1	761183	
teprotumumab	Tepezza	Horizon Therapeutics	1/21/2020	intravenous	fully human	IGF-1 receptor (CD221)	thyroid eye disease	761143	
tezepelumab	Tezspire	AstraZeneca	12/17/2021	subcutaneous	fully human	thymic stromal lymphopoietin	asthma	761224	
tildrakizumab	Ilumya	Merck	3/20/2018	subcutaneous	humanized	IL-23	plaque psoriasis	761067	Link
tislelizumab	Tevimbra	BeOne Medicines	3/13/2024	intravenous	humanized	PD-1	metastatic esophageal squamous cell carcinoma	761232	Link Link
tisotumab vedotin	Tivdak	Seagen	9/20/2021	intravenous	fully human	coagulation factor III	relapsed or refractory cervical cancer	761208	
tocilizumab	Actemra	Genentech	1/8/2010	intravenous subcutaneous	humanized	IL-6R	rheumatoid arthritis polyarticular juvenile idiopathic arthritis systemic juvenile idiopathic arthritis	125276	Link
tositumomab	Bexxar	GlaxoSmithKline	6/27/2003	intravenous	murine	CD20	follicular lymphoma	125011	
tralokinumab	Adbry	LEO Pharma	12/27/2021	subcutaneous	fully human	IL-13	atopic dermatitis	761180	
trastuzumab	Herceptin	Genentech	9/25/1998	intravenous	humanized	HER2	metastatic breast cancer	103792	Link
tremelimumab	Imjudo	AstraZeneca	10/21/2022	intravenous	fully human	CTLA-4	hepatocellular carcinoma	761289	
ublituximab	Briumvi	TG Therapeutics	12/28/2022	intravenous	chimeric	CD20	multiple sclerosis, chronic lymphocytic leukemia	761238	
ustekinumab	Stelara	Centocor	9/25/2009	subcutaneous	fully human	IL-12; IL-23	plaque psoriasis	125261	Link
ustekinumab	Stelara	Janssen Biotech	9/23/2016	subcutaneous intravenous	fully human	IL-12; IL-23	plaque psoriasis psoriatic arthritis Crohn's disease	761044	Link
vedolizumab	Entyvio	Takeda	5/20/2014	intravenous	humanized	integrin receptor	ulcerative colitis Crohn's disease	125476	Link
zanidatamab	Ziihera	Jazz Pharmaceuticals	11/20/2024	intravenous	humanized	HER2	biliary tract cancer	761416	
zenocutuzumab	Bizengri	Merus NV	12/4/2024	intravenous	humanized	HER2, ERBB3 (HER3)	cancer	761352	
zolbetuximab	Vyloy	Astellas Pharma	10/18/2024	intravenous	chimeric	Claudin 18 Isoform 2	gastric cancer	761365	

Tositumomab – Bexxar – 2003 – CD20

Mogamulizumab – Poteligeo – August 2018 – CCR4

Moxetumomab pasudotox – Lumoxiti – September 2018 – CD22

Cemiplimab – Libtayo – September 2018 – PD-1

Polatuzumab vedotin – Polivy – June 2019 – CD79B

The bispecific antibodies have arrived in the clinic. In 2009, the bispecific antibody catumaxomab was approved in the European Union and was later withdrawn for commercial reasons. Others include amivantamab, blinatumomab, teclistamab, and emicizumab.

== Economics ==
Since 2000, the therapeutic market for monoclonal antibodies has grown exponentially. In 2006, the "big 5" therapeutic antibodies on the market were bevacizumab, trastuzumab (both oncology), adalimumab, infliximab (both autoimmune and inflammatory disorders, 'AIID') and rituximab (oncology and AIID) accounted for 80% of revenues in 2006. In 2007, eight of the 20 best-selling biotechnology drugs in the U.S. are therapeutic monoclonal antibodies. This rapid growth in demand for monoclonal antibody production has been well accommodated by the industrialization of mAb manufacturing.
