= Bispecific monoclonal antibody =

Artificial protein

A bispecific monoclonal antibody (BsMAb, BsAb) is an artificial protein that can simultaneously bind to two different types of antigen or two different epitopes on the same antigen. Naturally occurring antibodies typically only target one antigen. BsAbs can be manufactured in several structural formats. BsAbs can be designed to recruit and activate immune cells, to interfere with receptor signaling and inactivate signaling ligands, and to force association of protein complexes. BsAbs have been explored for cancer immunotherapy, drug delivery, and Alzheimer's disease.

== Development history ==
The original concept of BsAbs was proposed by Nisonoff and his collaborators in the 1960s, including the first idea of antibody architecture and other findings. In 1975, the problem of producing pure antibodies was solved by the creation of hybridoma technology, and the new era of monoclonal antibodies (MAbs) came. In 1983, Milstein and Cuello created hybrid-hybridoma (quadroma) technology. In 1988, the single-chain variable fragment (scFv) was invented by the Huston team to minimize the refolding problems, which contains the incorrect domain pairing or aggregation of two-chain species. In 1996, the BsAbs became more developed when the knobs-into-holes technology emerged.

== Structural types and manufacturing methods ==
Three types of bispecific antibodies: trifunctional antibody, chemically linked Fab and bi-specific T-cell engager (bottom row). Blue and yellow parts distinguish parts from separate monoclonal antibodies.

There are many formats of BsAbs, but the two main categories are IgG-like and non-IgG-like. The main types of manufacturing methods are quadromas, chemical conjugation, and genetic recombination, and each method results in a unique format.

=== IgG-like ===
This format retains the traditional monoclonal antibody (mAb) structure of two Fab arms and one Fc region, except the two Fab sites bind different antigens. The most common types are called trifunctional antibodies, as they have three unique binding sites on the antibody: the two Fab regions, and the Fc region. Each heavy and light chain pair is from a unique mAb. The Fc region made from the two heavy chains forms the third binding site. These BsAbs are often manufactured with the quadroma, or the hybrid hybridoma, method.

The "knobs into holes" approach for manufacturing IgG-like bsMabs is shown on the left, while a diagram depicting the DVD-Ig format is on the right. The red dot indicates a possible site for introducing mutations in the heavy chain. Blue and yellow correspond to separate monoclonal antibodies.

However, the quadroma method relies on random chance to form usable BsAb, and can be inefficient. Another method for manufacturing IgG-like BsAb is called "knobs into holes," and relies on introducing a mutation for a large amino acid in the heavy chain from one mAb, and a mutation for a small amino acid in the other mAb's heavy chain. This allows the target heavy chains (and their corresponding light chains) to fit together better, and makes the production of BsAbs more reliable.

=== Non-IgG-like ===
There are other BsAbs that lack an Fc region entirely, and thus leads to relatively simple design strategies. These include chemically linked Fabs, consisting of only the Fab regions, and various types of bivalent and trivalent single-chain variable fragments (ScFvs). There are also fusion proteins mimicking the variable domains of two antibodies. The furthest developed of these newer formats are the bi-specific T-cell engagers (BiTEs), which uses the G_{4}S linker to connect two ScFvs-one CD3 antibody ScFv and one tumor-associated antigen (TAA) or tumor-specific ScFv-to redirect T cells to cancer cells for target killing. Other platforms include tetravalent antiparallel structure (TandAbs) and VH only (Bi-Nanobody). The TandAb platform is formed by a tetravalent antibody molecule containing two binding sites for each of two antigens. In this platform, the reverse pairing of two peptide chains forms a homodimer molecule. As an example, AFM_{11} is based on the TandAbs platform and targets both CD3 and CD19 to achieve therapeutic effects. AFM_{11} showed dose-dependent inhibition of Raji tumors in vivo. The Bi-Nanobody platform forms multi-specific binding through the connection between the VH regions of two or more antibody molecules. The products that are designed based on this platform are small molecules and these small molecules have high stability and better tissue permeability in vivo. Even though non-IgG-like BsAbs have low molecular weight and thus high tumor tissue permeability, their half-life is relatively short and they require multiple doses.

Despite the considerable differences between the various types and formats of bispecific antibodies, their manufacturing processes correspond in several steps:

- Genetic engineering and cloning – Different monoclonal antibodies or antibody fragments are fused. Recombinant DNA technology is applied to generate one single, bispecific antibody.
- Preparation of expression system – An expression system is chosen and prepared for antibody expression. Frequently used expression systems for therapeutic bispecific antibodies are mammalian cells, such as CHO cells, as they are effective in performing complex post-translational modifications.
- Transfection and protein production – Either via stable or transient transfection, genetic information of the desired bispecific antibodies is inserted into the expression system, which consequently expresses the proteins accordingly.
- Protein purification – Steps to isolate and enrich bispecific antibodies are taken. This can include several purification processes, such as protein A affinity chromatography or peptide tagging.
- Antibody characterization – Characterization and quality control conclude the production process. Effector functions, stability and binding specificity are examined at this stage.

== Mechanism of action ==
The mechanism of action of a BsAb, exemplified by catumaxomab, representing the first approved bispecific trifunctional antibody.

=== Recruiting and activating of immune cells ===
The binding of a BsAb to its target antigens can lead to a variety of effects. The most widely used application of this approach is in cancer immunotherapy, where BsAbs are engineered to simultaneously bind a cytotoxic cell and a target (a tumour cell) to be destroyed. It is possible to observe the bridging effect that BsAbs have on T cell/cancer cell interactions using label-free live cell imaging. Catumaxomab, one of the first trifunctional antibodies approved for therapeutic use, binds both CD3 on cytotoxic T cells and EpCAM on human adenocarcinomas. The Fc region additionally binds to a cell that expresses Fc receptors, like a macrophage, natural killer cell or dendritic cell. Since the Fc region is still intact, this allows for the BsAb to trigger common immune responses when recognized by an Fc receptor, such as antibody-dependent cell-mediated cytotoxicity or complement-dependent cytotoxicity.

Example of cancer cells being killed cytotoxic T-cells. Imaged with a label-free live cell imaging microscope.

=== Interfering with receptor signaling and inactivating signaling ligands ===
The growth of tumor cells can be stimulated or modulated by receptor tyrosine kinase (RTKs), including members of the Her family or insulin-like growth factor (IGF). The RTKs are therefore preferred targets in cancer therapy. Although monospecific RTK-targeting IgGs have already been available in the market, such as cetuximab (Erbitux) and panitumumab (Vectibix), both of which are directed against HER1. However, cancer cells can switch to a different pathway to escape the growth inhibition generated by blocking one signaling pathway. To improve the therapeutic efficacy, simultaneously interfering/blocking of two (or more) RTK signaling pathways, achieved through the mediation of BsAb to inactivate either the RTKs or their ligand, reduces the possibility of the escape mechanisms adopted by the tumor cells.

In addition, in working with Ebolavirus vaccines, a study has shown that a DVD-Ig antibody can be used to prevent viral escape from the endosome. Ebolaviruses infect cells by receptor-mediated endocytosis. Researchers developed DVD-Igs where the outer variable regions bind to the surface glycoproteins of the viral coat and enter the cell with the virus. These outer regions are cleaved in the viral endosome, revealing the inner variable regions that then bind to both the virus and internal receptors in the endosome. Blocking the interaction between the virus and endosomal proteins prevents viral escape from the endosome and further infection.

=== Forcing association of protein complexes ===
As an example, emicizumab (formerly RG6013) is an IgG derivative containing H-chain heterodimerization motifs, which was combined with the common light chain approach to prevent L-chain mispairing issues. With a bivalent composition, emicizumab brings two protein antigens together into one complex. Factor IXa and Factor X in the coagulation cascade are the cognate antigens which are bound by RG6013. These two factors are brought together by coagulation factor VIIIa in a healthy individual, while patients with bleeding disorder hemophilia A do not have VIIIa. Current treatment of this disorder is to supplement the patients with FVIII to reduce bleeding complications. But FVIII can be recognized as a foreign protein in these patients due to the absence of this protein and thus an immune response will be generated against this protein. Besides, FVIII has a short half-life (less than 15 hours) and thus is cleared rapidly. However, the humanized BsAb has lower immunogenicity and long serum half-life compared with FVIII and thus provide a better treatment for hemophilia.

== Advantages over ordinary monoclonal antibodies ==
Cancer immunotherapy with ordinary monoclonal antibodies does not activate T-lymphocytes because the Fab regions are already used for binding the tumor cells, and this type of cell does not have Fc receptors. Bispecific antibodies also have a higher cytotoxic potential, and bind to antigens that are expressed relatively weakly. The effective dose is around 0.01 mg·m^{−2}·d^{−1} (milligrams per square meter body surface area per day), which is several orders of magnitude lower than with ordinary antibodies. For non-IgG-like BsAbs, their smaller size allows them to reach antigens usually unavailable to conventional antibodies. In the case of Ebola vaccines, this method allows the antibody to target intracellular targets not usually accessible by traditional monoclonal antibody treatments.

Additionally, targeting more than one molecule can be useful to circumvent the regulation of parallel pathways and avoid resistance to the treatment. Binding or blocking multiple targets in a pathway can be beneficial to stopping disease, as most conditions have complicated multifaceted effects throughout the body. Together with combination therapies, BsAbs are being used more and more to treat certain types of cancers, as, over time, some tumors develop resistances to checkpoint inhibitors and/or co-stimulatory molecules.

== Current Scenario of bsAb drugs ==
Several bsAb drugs have been approved by the US FDA / EMA and over 180 are currently in clinical trials. The first bispecific antibody to gain regulatory approval, blinatumomab, targets CD19 on B cells and CD3 on T cells, leading to the activation of T cells and the destruction of B cells. Additional bispecific antibody drugs have since been approved by the US FDA: emicizumab, amivantamab, tebentafusp, faricimab, teclistamab, mosunetuzumab, epcoritamab, glofitamab. Among the bsAb programs currently under development, the combination of CD3 and tumor surface targets are the most popular targets pairs. Other popular targets are HER2, PD-1, PD-L1, EGFR, CTLA-4, etc., which as well as immune targets of PD-1, PD-L1, BCMA, CD47, CTLA-4, LAG-3, 4 -1BB. Additionally, with the approval of the several new bsAb since 2022, and new mechanisms for improving efficacy like development of hetero-dimer bispecific molecules, several additional possibilities of target pairs have emerged.

== Problems and current disadvantages ==
A primary issue accompanying BsAb development since the early stages has been achieving a high ratio of correctly paired bispecific antibodies. Early attempts to produce BsAbs resulted in large amounts of homodimers and other mispaired fragments. Novel pairing technologies have been developed to increase the heterodimerization rate, leading to higher yields and reduced production costs.

Furthermore, IgG-like antibodies can be immunogenic, which means the Fc region could cause detrimental downstream immune responses caused by cells that are activated by Fc receptors. The therapeutic use of BsAbs as a whole is still largely in development, with many clinical trials currently ongoing that are determining the efficacy and safety of BsAbs for treatment.

One major area of concern is the feasibility of administration and management of side effects, where the potential for therapeutic success must be weighed against possible risks. The occurrence of side effects primarily depends on the specific antibody, its target, and patient-specific factors. These factors have to be individually examined for each patient in order to evaluate the feasibility of a bispecific antibody treatment, and to assess the risk of infusion-related, immune-related, organ-specific, and hematologic side effects.

== Applications ==
Bispecific antibodies have a wide variety of applications in diagnosis and therapy. BsAbs can be combined with HRPO, can be used in pre-targeting strategies, and can be used to provide better imaging for early detection in diagnosis. To treat cancer, BsAbs can target immune cells precisely, help and reactive the immune cells, fine-tune the fate and function of immune cells, improve the tolerance of immune cells, and promote the return to immune homeostasis. BsAbs can also be applied to treat other diseases, including hemophilia A, diabetes, Alzheimer's disease, and ophthalmological diseases.

=== BsAbs on the market ===
Several bispecific antibodies are presently in clinical use. Blinatumomab, which targets CD19 and CD3, is used in the treatment of Philadelphia chromosome negative B cell acute lymphoblastic leukemia (ALL). Emicizumab, which targets clotting factors IXa and X, is used in the treatment of hemophilia A. Catumaxomab was withdrawn from the European market in 2017 for commercial reasons. Amivantamab, which targets epidermal growth factor (EGF) and MET receptors, for adult patients with locally advanced or metastatic non-small cell lung cancer (NSCLC) with epidermal growth factor receptor (EGFR) exon 20 insertion mutations. Teclistamab, which targets CD3 and B-cell maturation antigen (BCMA), is used in the treatment of multiple myeloma, and zenocutuzumab.

== See also ==
- Amivantamab
- Blinatumomab
- Catumaxomab
- Cevostamab
- Emicizumab
- Ivonescimab
- Tarlatamab
- Teclistamab
