= Fcab =

Antibodies fragments

Fcabs are antibody fragments engineered from the constant region of an antibody (Fc). In naturally occurring antibodies (such as IgGs), the antigen-binding sites are located at the variable regions (Fab).

== Overview ==
Fcabs can be expressed as soluble proteins or they can be engineered back into a full IgG. This type of antibodies are therefore able to recognise two different antigens, one at their Fab region and a second one at the Fc region, hence the name of bispecific antibodies. This antibody fragment is part of the modular antibody technology of F-star Biotechnology Ltd.

== See also ==
- Antibody Fragments
- Monoclonal antibodies
