= Trifunctional antibody =

Monoclonal antibody

The mechanism of action of a trifunctional antibody, exemplified by catumaxomab

A trifunctional antibody is a monoclonal antibody with binding sites for two different antigens, typically CD3 and a tumor antigen, making it a type of bispecific monoclonal antibody. In addition, its intact Fc-part can bind to an Fc receptor on accessory cells like conventional monospecific antibodies. The net effect is that this type of drug links T cells (via CD3) and monocytes/macrophages, natural killer cells, dendritic cells or other Fc receptor expressing cells to the tumor cells, leading to their destruction.

At an equivalent dose a trifunctional antibody is more potent (more than 1,000-fold) in eliminating tumor cells than conventional antibodies. These drugs evoke the removal of tumor cells by means of (i) antibody-dependent cell-mediated cytoxicity, a process also described for conventional antibodies and more importantly by (ii) polyclonal cytotoxic T cell responses with emphasis on CD8 T cells. These trifunctional antibodies also elicit individual anti-tumor immune responses in cancer patients treated with e.g. catumaxomab; i.e. autologous antibodies as well as CD4 and CD8 T cells directed against the tumor were detected. Furthermore, putative cancer stem cells from malignant ascites fluid were eliminated due to catumaxomab treatment.

Catumaxomab, was the first to be approved for clinical use (in 2009 for the treatment of malignant ascites in cancer patients).

Examples include catumaxomab (EpCAM / CD3), ertumaxomab (HER2/neu / CD3), FBTA05 (CD20 / CD3, proposed trade name Lymphomun) and TRBS07 (GD2 / CD3, proposed trade name Ektomab), drugs against various types of cancer.

== History ==
Trifunctional antibodies were the first type of bispecific monoclonal antibodies to be produced. The first concepts date back to the mid-1980s. For over twenty years, no such antibody was approved for clinical use, mainly because of manufacturing difficulties. Immunogenicity results from the fact that appropriate parental antibodies are obtained from rat and mice. After application, the patient's immune system usually produces anti-drug antibodies, which represent early indicators for a beneficial clinical outcome. Furthermore, despite the development of anti-drug antibody responses after the first catumaxomab application cycle a repeated cycle of catumaxomab also leads to a treatment success in recurrent malignant ascites. Cross-linking leads to the release of cytokines, resulting in manageable adverse effects like fever, nausea and vomiting, that were generally reversible and mainly related to the immunological mode of action (e.g. catumaxomab). Catumaxomab, which was approved in 2009 for the treatment of malignant ascites in cancer patients, satisfies these conditions. It was the first, and as of May 2011 the only approved one of these antibodies in clinical use.

Another way of immunotherapeutic intervention strategies is the exploration of bispecific antibodies with different structures, of which bi-specific T-cell engagers (BiTEs) have been produced since the mid-2000s.

== Production ==
At first, mouse hybridoma cells whose monoclonal antibodies target one of the desired antigens are produced. Independently, rat hybridoma cells targeting the other antigen are produced. These two cell types are hybridised, yielding hybrid-hybridomas or quadromas, which produce hybrid (trifunctional) antibody as well as pure mouse and pure rat antibody. The trifunctional antibody is extracted chromatographically with protein A.

Possible combinations of light and heavy chains in antibodies produced by quadroma cell lines. The seven antibodies on the left have at least one mismatched binding region. Of the three antibodies on the right, two are not hybridised, and the remaining (rightmost) is the desired trifunctional antibody. Mixed-species quadromas produce (nearly) none of the seven mismatched antibodies.

Using two different species (mouse and rat) has the advantage that less mismatched antibodies are produced because rat light chains preferably pair with rat heavy chains, and mouse light chains with mouse heavy chains. Single species (mouse/mouse or rat/rat) quadromas, by contrast, produce up to ten different kinds of antibody, most of which have mismatched heavy or light chains, or both.
