= Trontinemab =

Monoclonal antibody

Monoclonal antibody
- Type: ?

Clinical data
- Other names: RG6102

Legal status
- Legal status: Investigational

Identifiers
- CAS Number: 2568868-35-7
- UNII: N0GBZ1GWC2

Trontinemab (RG6102) is a monoclonal antibody (mAb) developed by Roche/Genentech for the treatment of Alzheimer's disease. It is based on gantenerumab, an anti-amyloid monoclonal antibody, and uses a brainshuttle domain to enhance its permeability through the blood–brain barrier. Compared to gantenerumab, it has 50 times as much penetrance into the brain.

== Mechanism of action ==
Trontinemab consists of the anti-amyloid mAb ganterenumab, fused with a Fab fragment that binds to human transferrin receptor 1 (TfR1) in the Fc domain. The fully-human mAb gantenerumab preferentially targets Aβ fibrils and Aβ oligomers over the monomer form (K_{D}: 0.6, 1.2, and 17 nM for the three forms, respectively). After binding to the Aβ, gantenerumab elicits amyloid clearance through microglia-mediated phagocytosis. Gantenerumab showed some amyloid clearance in human trials, especially at high doses; however, its lower-than-expected amyloid removal capacity, its inability to slow the disease progression, even at high doses, and its side effects, including amyloid-related imaging abnormalities (ARIAs), prevent the mAb from entering clinical practice.

To improve safety and efficacy, scientists tried to increase gantenerumab's ability to cross the blood–brain barrier by adding to the mAb a Fab fragment (brainshuttle module) that binds to one of the receptors expressed on the cells that make up the blood–brain barrier. The binding would then trigger endocytosis of the mAb, allowing it to be transported through the cell and released into the brain. Trontinemab contains a single anti-TfR1 Fab fragment bound to the Fc region, because initial testing showed that mAbs with two Fab fragments were easily degraded by lysosomes and had an inferior transportation efficiency compared to mAbs with a single anti-TfR1 Fab. The Fab fragment is strategically inverted to prevent antibody-dependent cellular cytotoxicity toward TfR1-expressing cells. When the brainshuttle module binds to TfR1, the mAb assumes a position that allows the two anti-amyloid arms to clash with each other and with the Fc receptors of the FcγR class on effector cells, preventing these cells from engaging the Fc domain of the mAb. The resulting mAb, trontinemab, has the following characteristics:

- 50 times greater penetrability potential of the blood–brain barrier relative to the original mAb.
- Even distribution throughout the brain.
- Low incidence of ARIAs, possibly due to the mAb entering mostly through small blood vessels—almost skipping entirely the aggregated amyloid-beta plaques on the big vessels.
- Low immune reaction to TfR1-expressing cells.

== Development history ==
Trontinemab was first developed under the code name RG6102 or, as referred to by Roche/Genentech, brain-shuttle gantenerumab. A phase 1 dose-escalation study in healthy volunteers showed a half-life of 3 to 6 days and a linear relationship between plasma and cerebrospinal fluid (CSF) concentrations. Brain exposure, measured by CSF/plasma ratio, increased from 0.1% for normal IgG to 0.8% with brain-shuttle gantenerumab. After gantenerumab failed in two phase-III trials, Roche changed the name of "brainshuttle gantenerumab" to trontinemab.

Following the first-in-human study, a phase-Ib/II study, "BrainShuttle AD", was launched. Patients enrolled in the study were randomized to a placebo group or one of the 0.2, 0.6, 1.8, or 3.6 mg/kg cohorts. The 1.8 mg/kg dose showed effectiveness in clearing amyloid-beta, reducing plaques by an average of 84 centiloids (centiloid (CL) is a scale that quantifies amyloid level using tracers like florbetapir (18F)) on day 84. 75% of participants in the 1.8mg/kg group saw their amyloid-beta concentration dropped below the threashold of amyloid positivity (24.1 CL).

Later reports of the trial showed that the highest planned dose, 3.6 mg/kg, cleared an average of 107 CL on day 84. After combining the results of both parts 1 and 2 of the study, the highest dose group cleared a mean of 99 CL. 91% of the participants in the 3.6 mg/kg cohort were below the amyloid-positivity threshold, and amyloid-PET burden was reduced to below 11 CL in 72% of them. There were no non-responders in the 3.6mg/kg cohort.

Aβ depletion was early, deep, and even, with all lobes of the neocortex showing reduction amyloid burden. Brain regions showing rapid amyloid depletion temporarily shrank due to the large volume of amyloid removed. When amyloid beta had been cleared, the reduction stopped. Trontinemab treatment increased Aβ42 concentration and Aβ42/40 ratio in the CSF, as well as decreased disease biomarkers, including total Tau protein, pTau181, neurogranin, and SNAP25 levels.

As for the safety profile, the most common adverse effects were infusion-related reactions (IRRs) and anemia. The incidence of IRRs lessened when more aggressive premedication with steroids was used, while the incidence of anemia was attributed to frequent blood draws and was considered infrequent and mild. ARIA (both ARIA-E and ARIA-H) was uncommon, with a combined incidence of 4.1% in the highest dose group. There was a fatal case in the 1.8 mg/kg cohort—a 78-year-old woman with hemorrhagic bleeding in her right frontal lobe on day 44. She had been considered a person with a high bleeding risk due to her screening tests showing that she had superficial siderosis and genetic factors, which are the signs of probable cerebral amyloid angiopathy. The trial's protocol was amended after her death to exclude those with superficial siderosis.

At the 2025 Alzheimer's Association International Conference, Roche announced plans for two phase-III, identically designed trials, TRONTIER 1 and TRONTIER 2, both of which are, as of September 9th, 2026, actively enrolling patients with mild-to-moderate AD. Participants will go through a master prescreening study called TRAVELLER, then undergo an 8-week screening phase, and be randomized into two cohorts: one receiving trontinemab at 3.6 mg/kg (every 4 weeks for the first 24 weeks, then the dosing interval extends to every 12 weeks), and the other receiving a placebo. The trial includes patients with Mini–Mental State Examination (MMSE) scores of 2.2 or higher and Clinical Dementia Rating scores between 0.5 and 1, aged 50 to 90, with evidence of amyloid pathology. Excluded are individuals with any brain macrohemorrhage, four or more microhemorrhages, severe white matter disease, or other conditions that could impact cognition.

In 2026 "The PrevenTron study will give trontinemab to people aged between 55 and 80 who have no cognitive symptoms but whose blood tests show biological signs associated with Alzheimer’s. Around 1,600 volunteers will take part internationally, including at more than 15 centres in Britain, with an NHS trust in Surrey the first in Europe to start recruiting."
