= Brainshuttle =

Technology assisting antibody uptake

Brainshuttle or brain shuttle is a technology developed by Roche to help molecules such as monoclonal antibodies to cross the blood-brain barrier more than they would otherwise. It has been tested with anti-amyloid monoclonal antibodies such as trontinemab.

== Mechanism ==
The formulation reported in a 2013 paper by Niewoehner et al. used a single-chain Fab fragment of a monoclonal antibody against the transferrin receptor, which normally mediates transcytosis of a 76 kDa glycoprotein across the blood–brain barrier. Epitope mapping of the anti-TfR antibody showed that the Brain Shuttle module binds at the apical domain of TfR, which is distant to the binding site of transferrin. This anti-TfR fragment was fused to the Fc region at the C-terminal end of either one or both of the heavy chains of an anti-amyloid beta antibody, mAb31. The version with two anti-TfR fragments had higher affinity to TfR than the single form but the two-fragment version was sorted to lysosomes and disappeared. The single form was successfully transported into the CNS compartment and rapidly attached to plaques in the brain, reaching maximum coverage at 8 hours after injection compared to 7 days for the original mAb31. The double form did not reach the plaques even at a high dose (17.44 mg/kg), whereas the single form showed a significant reduction in plaque numbers over mAb31 both in cortex and hippocampus at the middose of 2.67 mg/kg, and a smaller reduction at the low dose of 0.53 mg/kg.

== Usage ==
The system has been further developed into the experimental drug trontinemab, consisting of a Brainshuttle module fused to the anti-amyloid antibody gantenerumab, which started a Phase III trial in 2025. It has also been tested with peptide inhibitors of beta-secretase 1 (BACE-1).
