= Chemically linked Fab =

Example of chemically linked Fabs: two Fab' fragments linked with a thioether, resulting in a F(ab')_{2}. The molecule is bound to a tumour cell via the tumour antigen CD30 and to a macrophage via an Fc receptor.

Two chemically linked fragments antigen-binding form an artificial antibody that binds to two different antigens, making it a type of bispecific antibody. They are fragments antigen-binding (Fab or Fab') of two different monoclonal antibodies and are linked by chemical means like a thioether. Typically, one of the Fabs binds to a tumour antigen (such as CD30) and the other to a protein on the surface of an immune cell, for example an Fc receptor on a macrophage. In this way, tumour cells are attached to immune cells, which destroy them.

In the late 1990s and early 2000s, clinical trials with chemically linked Fabs were conducted for the treatment of various types of cancer. Early results were promising, but the concept was dropped because of high production costs.

Bi-specific T-cell engagers employ a similar mechanism of action while being cheaper.
