= Ertumaxomab =

Monoclonal antibody

Monoclonal antibody
- Type: Trifunctional antibody
- Source: Rat/mouse hybrid
- Target: HER2/neu, CD3

Clinical data
- Trade names: Rexomun
- ATC code: none

Identifiers
- CAS Number: 509077-99-0
- ChemSpider: none
- UNII: L5L45YGP1O

Ertumaxomab (trade name Rexomun) is a rat-murine hybrid monoclonal antibody designed to treat some types of cancer.

It is a trifunctional antibody which works by linking T-lymphocytes and macrophages to the cancer cells.

Phase II clinical trial evaluating the treatment of breast cancer was terminated due to change in Fresenius' development plans. (So they could concentrate on their other product catumaxomab (trade name Removab).)
