= F-star =

F-star Biotechnology Ltd.
- Industry: Pharmaceutical
- Headquarters: Cambridge, UK
- Website: www.f-star.com

F-star Biotechnology Ltd. was a biotechnology company, founded in Vienna in 2006, with a former main research site in Cambridge, UK. The company was focused on developing bispecific monoclonal antibodies using a modular combinatorial approach that engineers the Fc constant region of an immunoglobulin into a novel antigen-binding site.
