= Teclistamab =

Monoclonal antibody

Monoclonal antibody
- Type: Bi-specific T-cell engager
- Source: Humanized
- Target: BCMA, CD3

Clinical data
- Other names: JNJ-64007957, teclistamab-cqyv
- License data: US DailyMed: Teclistamab
- Pregnancy category: AU: C
- Routes of administration: Subcutaneous injection
- Drug class: Antineoplastic
- ATC code: L01FX24 (WHO)

Legal status
- Legal status: AU: S4 (Prescription only); CA: ℞-only; US: ℞-only; EU: Rx-only

Identifiers
- CAS Number: 2119595-80-9
- DrugBank: DB16655
- UNII: 54534MX6Z9
- KEGG: D12177

Chemical and physical data
- Formula: C_{6383}H_{9847}N_{1695}O_{2003}S_{40}
- Molar mass: 143662.25 g·mol^{−1}

Teclistamab, sold under the brand name Tecvayli, is a human bispecific monoclonal antibody used for the treatment of relapsed and refractory multiple myeloma. It is a bispecific antibody that targets the CD3 receptor expressed on the surface of T-cells and B-cell maturation antigen (BCMA), which is expressed on the surface of malignant multiple myeloma B-lineage cells.

The most common side effects include hypogammaglobulinemia (low immunoglobulin or antibody levels in the blood, which increases the risk of infection), cytokine release syndrome (a form of systemic inflammatory response syndrome), neutropenia (low levels of neutrophils, a type of white blood cell that fights infection), anemia (low levels of red blood cells or hemoglobin), pain in the muscles and bones, tiredness, thrombocytopenia (low levels of blood platelets, components that help the blood to clot), injection site reactions, upper respiratory tract (nose and throat) infection, lymphopenia (low levels of lymphocytes, a type of white blood cell), diarrhea, pneumonia (infection of the lungs), nausea (feeling sick), fever, headache, cough, constipation and pain.

Teclistamab is the first bispecific B-cell maturation antigen (BCMA)-directed CD3 T-cell engager. Teclistamab was approved for medical use in the European Union in August 2022, and in the United States in October 2022. The US Food and Drug Administration (FDA) considers it to be a first-in-class medication.

== Medical uses ==
Teclistamab is indicated for the treatment of adults with relapsed and refractory multiple myeloma.

== Contraindications ==
In the US, the prescribing information for teclistamab has a boxed warning for life threatening or fatal cytokine release syndrome (CRS) and neurologic toxicity, including immune effector cell-associated neurotoxicity (ICANS). Among people who received teclistamab at the recommended dose, CRS occurred in 72%, neurologic toxicity in 57%, and ICANS in 6%. Grade 3 CRS occurred in 0.6% of people and Grade 3 or 4 neurologic toxicity occurred in 2.4%.

== Adverse effects ==
The most common adverse reactions (≥20%) occurring in the 165 patients in the safety population, were pyrexia, CRS, musculoskeletal pain, injection site reaction, fatigue, upper respiratory tract infection, nausea, headache, pneumonia, and diarrhea. The most common Grade 3 to 4 laboratory abnormalities (≥20%) were decreased lymphocytes, decreased neutrophils, decreased white blood cells, decreased hemoglobin, and decreased platelets.

== History ==
Teclistamab-cqyv was evaluated in MajesTEC-1 (NCT03145181; NCT04557098), a single-arm, multi-cohort, open-label, multi-center study. The efficacy population consisted of 110 participants who had previously received at least three prior therapies, including a proteasome inhibitor, an immunomodulatory agent, and an anti-CD38 monoclonal antibody, and had not received prior BCMA-targeted therapy.

The application for teclistamab was granted orphan drug, priority review, and breakthrough therapy designations.

== Society and culture ==
=== Legal status ===
In July 2022, the Committee for Medicinal Products for Human Use (CHMP) of the European Medicines Agency (EMA) adopted a positive opinion, recommending the granting of a conditional marketing authorization for the medicinal product Tecvayli, intended for treatment of adult patients with relapsed and refractory multiple myeloma, who have received at least three prior therapies. Tecvayli was reviewed under EMA's accelerated assessment program. The applicant for this medicinal product is Janssen-Cilag International N.V. Teclistamab was authorized for medical use in the European Union in August 2022.

=== Names ===
Teclistamab is the international nonproprietary name and owned by Genmab A/S (INN).
