= Rovalpituzumab tesirine =

Experimental antibody-drug conjugate

Monoclonal antibody
- Type: Whole antibody
- Source: Humanized
- Target: DLL3

Clinical data
- ATC code: None

Identifiers
- CAS Number: 1613313-09-9
- ChemSpider: none
- UNII: P256HB60FF
- KEGG: D10981

Chemical and physical data
- Formula: C_{6416}H_{9894}N_{1698}O_{2028}S_{46} (non-glycosylated)

Rovalpituzumab tesirine (Rova-T) is an experimental antibody-drug conjugate targeting the protein DLL3 on tumor cells. It was originally developed by Stemcentrx and was purchased by AbbVie. It was tested for use in small-cell lung cancer, but development was terminated after unsuccessful phase III trial.

== Development ==
In 2018, an Independent Data Monitoring Committee found that in the TAHOE phase III trial, Rova-T shortened survival of lung cancer patients compared to SOC chemotherapy topotecan, prompting termination of trial enrollment. Another phase III trial (MERU) demonstrated no survival benefit over placebo. A phase II trial using the drug as a third-line treatment for relapsed or refractory lung cancer showed objective response rate at just 16%.

== Chemical structure ==

Chemical structure of "tesirine" (drawn in black). It consists of a pyrrolobenzodiazepine type dimer (top), which is the actual anti-cancer agent, a Val–Ala structure that can be cleaved by an enzyme to detach the anti-cancer agent from the antibody, a polyethylene glycol spacer, and a maleimide linker which is attached to a cysteine in the antibody's (rovalpituzumab's) peptide backbone, drawn blue. Each rovalpituzumab molecule has an average of two such attachments.

== See also ==
- Vadastuximab talirine, with a similar cytotoxin
