= CLDN18 =

Protein-coding gene in humans

Identifiers
- Aliases: CLDN18, SFTA5, SFTPJ, claudin 18
- External IDs: OMIM: 609210; MGI: 1929209; GeneCards: CLDN18

Gene location (Human)
Chr.	Chromosome 3 (human)
Band	3q22.3	Start	137,998,735 bp
Band	3q22.3	End	138,033,655 bp

Gene location (Mouse)
Chr.	Chromosome 9 (mouse)
Band	9|9 E3.3	Start	99,571,514 bp
Band	9|9 E3.3	End	99,599,320 bp
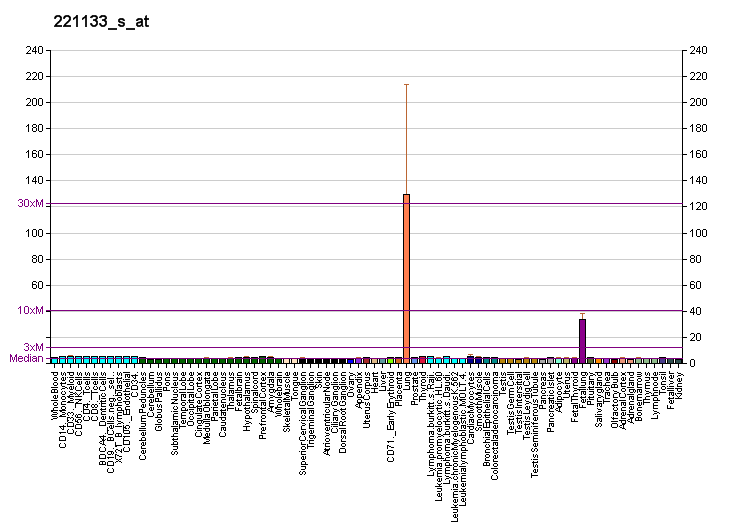

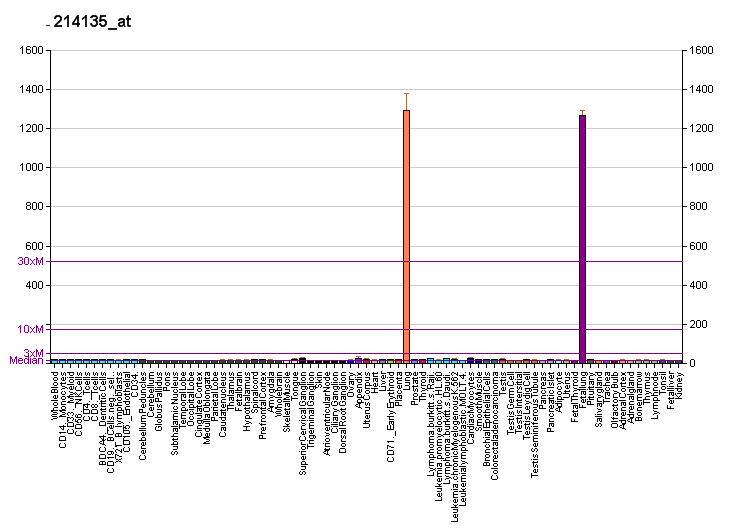

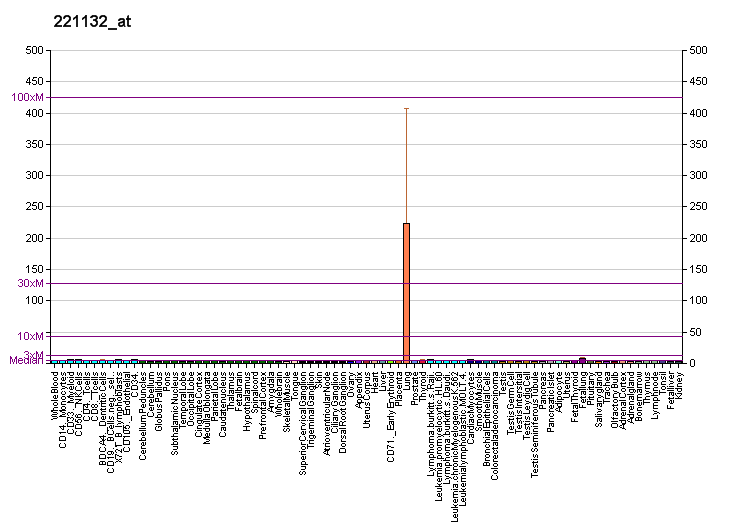
RNA expression pattern
Bgee	Human / Mouse (ortholog); Top expressed in: pylorus; lower lobe of lung; cardia; right lung; upper lobe of lung; upper lobe of left lung; body of stomach; gastric mucosa; visceral pleura; fundus / Top expressed in: mucous cell of stomach; right lung lobe; epithelium of stomach; pyloric antrum; left lung; left lung lobe; blastocyst; duodenum; embryo; right kidney; More reference expression data
BioGPS	More reference expression data
Gene ontology
Molecular function	structural molecule activity; identical protein binding
Cellular component	integral component of membrane; cell junction; plasma membrane; membrane; bicellular tight junction
Biological process	negative regulation of protein localization to nucleus; TNFSF11-mediated signaling pathway; calcium-independent cell-cell adhesion via plasma membrane cell-adhesion molecules; digestive tract development; negative regulation of osteoclast development; negative regulation of bone resorption; response to ethanol
Sources:Amigo / QuickGO
Orthologs
Databases	NCBI: entry; OMA: entry
Species	Human	Mouse
Entrez	51208	56492
Ensembl	ENSG00000066405	ENSMUSG00000032473
UniProt	P56856	P56857
RefSeq (mRNA)	NM_016369; NM_001002026	NM_001194921; NM_001194922; NM_001194923; NM_019815
RefSeq (protein)	NP_001002026; NP_057453	NP_001181850; NP_001181851; NP_001181852; NP_062789
Location (UCSC)	Chr 3: 138 – 138.03 Mb	Chr 9: 99.57 – 99.6 Mb
PubMed search
- Wikidata
View/Edit Human	View/Edit Mouse

Claudin-18 is a protein that in humans is encoded by the CLDN18 gene. It belongs to the group of claudins.

CLDN18 belongs to the large claudin family of proteins, which form tight junction strands in epithelial cells . [supplied by OMIM]

== Clinical significance ==
Isoform 2 (Claudin 18.2) is abundant in gastric tumors.

Zolbetuximab targets Claudin 18.2 to help treat gastric and gastroesophageal junction cancers.
