= Mosunetuzumab =

Monoclonal antibody

Monoclonal antibody
- Type: Bi-specific T-cell engager
- Source: Humanized
- Target: CD20, CD3

Clinical data
- Trade names: Lunsumio
- Other names: BTCT4465A, RG7828, mosunetuzumab-axgb
- AHFS/Drugs.com: Monograph
- License data: US DailyMed: Mosunetuzumab
- Drug class: Antineoplastic
- ATC code: L01FX25 (WHO)

Legal status
- Legal status: CA: ℞-only; US: ℞-only; EU: Rx-only

Identifiers
- CAS Number: 1905409-39-3
- DrugBank: DB15434
- UNII: LDJ89SS0YG
- KEGG: D11463

Chemical and physical data
- Formula: C_{6515}H_{10031}N_{1725}O_{2025}S_{43}
- Molar mass: 146301.54 g·mol^{−1}

Mosunetuzumab, sold under the brand name Lunsumio, is a monoclonal antibody used for the treatment of follicular lymphoma. It bispecifically binds CD20 and CD3 to engage T-cells. It was developed by Genentech.

The most common adverse reactions (≥20%) include cytokine release syndrome, fatigue, rash, pyrexia, and headache. The most common grade 3 to 4 laboratory abnormalities (≥10%) include decreased lymphocyte count, decreased phosphate, increased glucose, decreased neutrophil count, increased uric acid, decreased white blood cell count, decreased hemoglobin, and decreased platelets.

Mosunetuzumab was approved for medical use in the European Union in June 2022, and in the United States in December 2022. The US Food and Drug Administration (FDA) considers it to be a first-in-class medication.

== Medical uses ==
Mosunetuzumab is indicated for the treatment of adults with relapsed or refractory follicular lymphoma after two or more lines of systemic therapy.

== Contraindications ==
The prescribing information for mosunetuzumab in the US has a boxed warning for serious or life-threatening cytokine release syndrome.

== History ==
Mosunetuzumab-axgb was evaluated in GO29781 (NCT02500407), an open-label, multicenter, multi-cohort study. The efficacy population consisted of 90 patients with relapsed or refractory FL who had received at least two prior lines of systemic therapy, including an anti-CD20 monoclonal antibody and an alkylating agent.

The US Food and Drug Administration (FDA) granted the application for mosunetuzumab priority review, breakthrough therapy, and orphan drug designations.

== Society and culture ==
=== Legal status ===
In April 2022, the Committee for Medicinal Products for Human Use (CHMP) of the European Medicines Agency (EMA) adopted a positive opinion, recommending the granting of a conditional marketing authorization for mosunetuzumab under the brand name Lunsumio, intended for the treatment of relapsed or refractory follicular lymphoma. The applicant for this medicinal product is Roche Registration GmbH. Mosunetuzumab was approved for medical use in the European Union in June 2022.

=== Names ===
Mosunetuzumab is the international nonproprietary name (INN).
