= Glofitamab =

Medication

Monoclonal antibody
- Type: Whole antibody
- Source: Humanized
- Target: CD20 and CD3

Clinical data
- Trade names: Columvi
- Other names: RO7082859, glofitamab-gxbm
- License data: US DailyMed: Glofitamab
- Pregnancy category: AU: C
- Routes of administration: Intravenous
- Drug class: Antineoplastic
- ATC code: L01FX28 (WHO)

Legal status
- Legal status: AU: S4 (Prescription only); CA: ℞-only / Schedule D; US: ℞-only; EU: Rx-only

Identifiers
- CAS Number: 2229047-91-8
- DrugBank: DB16371
- UNII: 06P3KLK2J8
- KEGG: D11833

Chemical and physical data
- Formula: C_{8632}H_{13326}N_{2296}O_{2701}S_{58}
- Molar mass: 194344.41 g·mol^{−1}

Glofitamab, sold under the brand name Columvi, is a bispecific monoclonal antibody used for the treatment of large B-cell lymphoma. It is a bispecific CD20-directed CD3 T-cell engager developed by Roche.

The most common side effects include cytokine release syndrome, muscle and bone pain, rash, and tiredness.

It was approved for medical use in Canada in July 2023, in the United States in June 2023, and in the European Union in July 2023.

== Medical uses ==
Glofitamab is indicated for the treatment of adults with relapsed or refractory diffuse large B-cell lymphoma. Specifically it is indicated for the treatment of adults with certain types of diffuse large B-cell lymphoma or large B-cell lymphoma who have received at least two prior treatments that did not work or are no longer working.

== Adverse effects ==
The US Food and Drug Administration (FDA) label includes a boxed warning for serious or fatal cytokine release syndrome. A report in January 2026 from Genentech warned that Glofitamab causes the cytokine release syndrome at rates of 1 to 20% in different studies when used to treat patients with lymphomas.

== History ==
The FDA approved glofitamab based on evidence from a clinical trial NP30179 (NCT03075696) of 145 participants with large B-cell lymphoma who received at least one dose of glofitamab. The efficacy of glofitamab was assessed in 132 participants with de novo diffuse large B‑cell lymphoma, not otherwise specified (80%) or large B-cell lymphoma arising from follicular lymphoma (20%), who have received at least two prior lines of therapy and who received at least one dose of glofitamab. The trial was conducted at 32 sites in 13 of countries in Australia, Belgium, Canada, Czech Republic, Denmark, Spain, Finland, France, Italy, New Zealand, Poland, Taiwan, and the United States. The benefit and side effects of glofitamab were also evaluated in the clinical trial. All participants received glofitamab until the disease progressed or the side effects became too toxic.

== Society and culture ==
=== Legal status ===
In April 2023, the Committee for Medicinal Products for Human Use (CHMP) of the European Medicines Agency (EMA) adopted a positive opinion, recommending the granting of a conditional marketing authorization for the medicinal product Columvi, intended for the treatment of diffuse large B‑cell lymphoma (DLBCL). The applicant for this medicinal product is Roche Registration GmbH. Glofitamab was approved for medical use in the European Union in July 2023.

=== Names ===
Glofitamab is the international nonproprietary name.
