= Zolbetuximab =

Monoclonal antibody

Monoclonal antibody
- Type: Whole antibody
- Source: Chimeric (mouse/human)
- Target: CLDN18.2

Clinical data
- Trade names: Vyloy
- Other names: IMAB362, claudiximab, zolbetuximab-clzb
- AHFS/Drugs.com: Vyloy
- License data: US DailyMed: Zolbetuximab
- Routes of administration: Intravenous infusion
- ATC code: L01FX31 (WHO)

Legal status
- Legal status: AU: S4 (Prescription only); CA: ℞-only; US: ℞-only; EU: Rx-only; JP: Rx-only

Identifiers
- CAS Number: 1496553-00-4
- ChemSpider: none
- UNII: TF5MPQ8WGY
- KEGG: D11527

Zolbetuximab, sold under the brand name Vyloy, is a monoclonal antibody used for the treatment of gastric cancer. It is a claudin 18.2-directed cytolytic antibody against isoform 2 of Claudin-18. Zolbetuximab was developed by Ganymed Pharmaceuticals. Astellas Pharma acquired the rights to zolbetuximab in December 2016, when it acquired Ganymed Pharmaceuticals.

Zolbetuximab was approved for medical use in Japan in March 2024, in the European Union in September 2024, and in the United States in October 2024. The US Food and Drug Administration (FDA) considers it to be a first-in-class medication.

== Medical use ==
Zolbetuximab is indicated in combination with fluoropyrimidine- and platinum-containing chemotherapy for the first-line treatment of adults with locally advanced unresectable or metastatic human epidermal growth factor receptor 2 (HER2)-negative gastric or gastroesophageal junction adenocarcinoma whose tumors are claudin (CLDN) 18.2 positive.

== Adverse effects ==
The most common adverse reactions include nausea, vomiting, decreased appetite, weight loss, neutropenia (low levels of neutrophils, a type of white blood cell that fights infections), fever, hypoalbuminemia (low levels of albumin, a blood protein), and peripheral edema (swelling, especially of the ankles and feet).

Other side effects include hypertension (high blood pressure), dyspepsia (indigestion), chills, salivary hypersecretion (excess production of saliva), infusion-related reactions and hypersensitivity (allergic reactions).

== History ==
Zolbetuximab has been tested in two phase III clinical trials for gastric cancer, SPOTLIGHT and GLOW. A combined analysis of the two trials confirmed that zolbetuximab, when added to chemotherapy, improved progression-free survival and overall survival for patients with HER2-negative, locally advanced unresectable or metastatic gastric or gastroesophageal junction adenocarcinoma whose tumors were positive for claudin 18.2.

== Society and culture ==
=== Legal status ===
In Japan, zolbetuximab is approved for the treatment of people with CLDN18.2-positive, unresectable, advanced, or recurrent gastric cancer.

In July 2024, the Committee for Medicinal Products for Human Use of the European Medicines Agency adopted a positive opinion, recommending the granting of a marketing authorization for the medicinal product Vyloy, intended for the treatment of gastric or gastro-esophageal junction adenocarcinoma. The applicant for this medicinal product is Astellas Pharma Europe B.V. Vyloy was authorized for medical use in the European Union in September 2024.

Zolbetuximab was approved for medical use in the United States in October 2024.

=== Names ===
Zolbetuximab is the international nonproprietary name.

Zolbetuximab is sold under the brand name Vyloy.
