= Blinatumomab =

Pharmaceutical drug

Monoclonal antibody
- Type: Bi-specific T-cell engager
- Source: Mouse
- Target: CD19, CD3

Clinical data
- Trade names: Blincyto
- Other names: AMG103, MT103, MEDI-538, Blina
- AHFS/Drugs.com: Monograph
- MedlinePlus: a614061
- License data: US DailyMed: Blinatumomab
- Pregnancy category: AU: C
- Routes of administration: Intravenous
- Drug class: Antineoplastic
- ATC code: L01FX07 (WHO)

Legal status
- Legal status: AU: S4 (Prescription only); CA: ℞-only / Schedule D; US: ℞-only; EU: Rx-only

Pharmacokinetic data
- Bioavailability: 100% (IV)
- Metabolism: degradation into small peptides and amino acids
- Elimination half-life: 2.11 hours
- Excretion: urine (negligible)

Identifiers
- CAS Number: 853426-35-4
- DrugBank: DB09052
- ChemSpider: none
- UNII: 4FR53SIF3A
- KEGG: D09325

Chemical and physical data
- Formula: C_{2367}H_{3577}N_{649}O_{772}S_{19}
- Molar mass: 54086.56 g·mol^{−1}

Blinatumomab, sold under the brand name Blincyto, is a biopharmaceutical medication used for the treatment of Philadelphia chromosome-negative relapsed or refractory acute lymphoblastic leukemia. It belongs to a class of constructed monoclonal antibodies, bi-specific T-cell engagers (BiTEs), that exert action selectively and direct the human immune system to act against tumor cells. Blinatumomab is a bispecific CD19-directed CD3 T-cell engager that specifically targets the CD19 antigen present on B cells. Blinatumomab is given via intravenous infusion.

Blinatumomab was approved for medical use in the United States in December 2014, in Australia in November 2015, in Canada in March 2016, and in the European Union in November 2023. It is on the World Health Organization's List of Essential Medicines.

== Medical use ==
In the US, blinatumomab is indicated for the treatment of people one month and older with CD19-positive B-cell precursor acute lymphoblastic leukemia in first or second complete remission with minimal residual disease greater than or equal to 0.1%; relapsed or refractory CD19-positive B-cell precursor acute lymphoblastic leukemia; and CD19-positive Philadelphia chromosome-negative B-cell precursor acute lymphoblastic leukemia in the consolidation phase of multiphase chemotherapy.

In the EU, blinatumomab is indicated for the treatment of adults with CD19 positive relapsed or refractory B‑cell precursor acute lymphoblastic leukemia; for the treatment of adults with Philadelphia chromosome-negative CD19 positive B-cell precursor acute lymphoblastic leukemia in first or second complete remission with minimal residual disease greater than or equal to 0.1%; for the treatment of children aged one month or older with Philadelphia chromosome-negative CD19 positive B‑cell precursor acute lymphoblastic leukemia which is refractory or in relapse after receiving at least two prior therapies or in relapse after receiving prior allogeneic hematopoietic stem cell transplantation; for the treatment of children aged one month or older with high-risk first relapsed Philadelphia chromosome-negative CD19 positive B-cell precursor acute lymphoblastic leukemia as part of the consolidation therapy; as part of consolidation therapy for the treatment of adults with newly diagnosed Philadelphia chromosome negative CD19 positive B-cell precursor acute lymphoblastic leukemia.

Although hypogammaglobulinemia (HGG) rates are relatively high with blinatumomab, the incidence of grade ≥3 infections remained low, particularly after reinduction therapy for relapsed B-ALL.

== Mechanism of action ==
Blinatumomab linking a T cell to a malignant B cell.

Blinatumomab is a bispecific T-cell engager (BiTE). It enables a patient's T cells to recognize malignant B cells. A molecule of blinatumomab combines two binding sites: a CD3 site for T cells and a CD19 site for the target B cells. CD3 is part of the T cell receptor. The drug works by linking these two cell types and activating the T cell to exert cytotoxic activity on the target cell. CD3 and CD19 are expressed in both pediatric and adult patients, making blinatumomab a potential therapeutic option for both pediatric and adult populations.

== History ==
Blinatumomab (originally known as MT103) was developed by a German-American company Micromet, in cooperation with Lonza; In 2012, Micromet was purchased by Amgen, which furthered the drug's clinical trials.

In July 2014, the FDA granted breakthrough therapy status to blinatumomab for the treatment of acute lymphoblastic leukemia. In October 2014, Amgen's Biologics License Application for blinatumomab was granted priority review designation by the US Food and Drug Administration (FDA).

In December 2014, the blinatumomab was approved for use in the United States to treat Philadelphia chromosome-negative relapsed or refractory acute lymphoblastic leukemia under the FDA's accelerated approval program; marketing authorization depended on the outcome of clinical trials that were ongoing at the time of approval.

== Society and culture ==
=== Economics ===
Amgen announced that the price for blinatumomab would be US$178,000 per year, which made it the most expensive cancer drug on the market. Merck's pembrolizumab was priced at US$150,000 per year when it launched (in September 2014). At the time of initial approval, only about 1,000 patients in the US had an indication for blinatumomab.

Memorial Sloan-Kettering Cancer Center calculated that according to "value-based pricing," assuming that the value of a year of life is US$121,000 with a 15% "toxicity discount," the market price of blinatumomab should be US$12,612 a month, compared to the market price of US$64,260 a month. A representative of Amgen said, "The price of Blincyto reflects the significant clinical, economic and humanistic value of the product to patients and the health-care system. The price also reflects the complexity of developing, manufacturing and reliably supplying innovative biologic medicines."
