= Emicizumab =

Monoclonal antibody

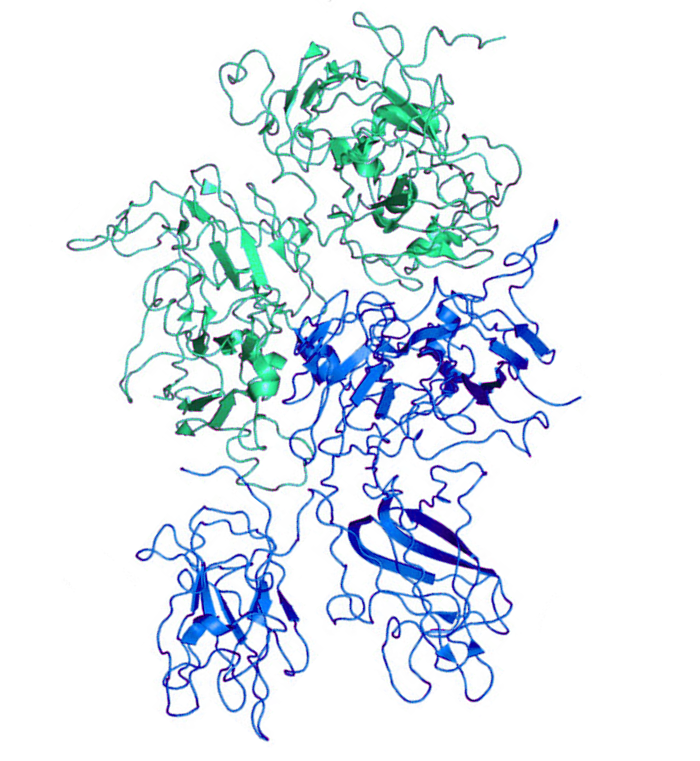

Monoclonal antibody
- Type: Whole antibody
- Source: Humanized
- Target: Activated factor IX, factor X

Clinical data
- Trade names: Hemlibra
- Other names: ACE910, RG6013, emicizumab-kxwh
- AHFS/Drugs.com: Monograph
- MedlinePlus: a622046
- License data: US DailyMed: Emicizumab
- Pregnancy category: AU: B2
- Routes of administration: Subcutaneous
- ATC code: B02BX06 (WHO)

Legal status
- Legal status: AU: S4 (Prescription only); CA: ℞-only / Schedule D; US: ℞-only; EU: Rx-only; In general: ℞ (Prescription only)

Identifiers
- CAS Number: 1610943-06-0
- DrugBank: DB13923
- ChemSpider: none
- UNII: 7NL2E3F6K3
- KEGG: D10821

Chemical and physical data
- Formula: C_{6434}H_{9940}N_{1724}O_{2047}S_{45}
- Molar mass: 145639.02 g·mol^{−1}

Emicizumab, sold under the brand name Hemlibra, is a humanized bispecific monoclonal antibody for the treatment of haemophilia A, developed by Genentech and Chugai (both organizations are subsidiaries of Hoffmann-La Roche). Emicizumab is a bispecific factor IXa- and factor X-directed antibody.

Emicizumab was first approved by the U.S. Food and Drug Administration (FDA) in November 2017 for routine prophylaxis in patients with hemophilia A who have developed factor VIII inhibitors. In October 2018, the FDA expanded approval, under the breakthrough therapy designation, to include all patients with hemophilia A, regardless of inhibitor status. The U.S. Food and Drug Administration (FDA) considers it to be a first-in-class medication. It is on the World Health Organization's List of Essential Medicines.

== Medical uses ==
Emicizumab is indicated for routine prophylaxis to prevent or reduce the frequency of bleeding episodes in people with hemophilia A (congenital factor VIII deficiency) with or without factor VIII inhibitors.

=== Available forms ===
Emicizumab is administered as a subcutaneous injection with flexible dosing options. The drug can be administered once weekly, every two weeks, or every four weeks, providing patients and healthcare providers with dosing flexibility based on individual needs and preferences.

The long elimination half-life of approximately 28–32 days supports the extended dosing intervals, making it more convenient compared to traditional factor VIII replacement therapy, which typically requires more frequent administration.

== Adverse effects ==
The most common adverse reactions (incidence ≥10%) are injection site reactions, headache, and arthralgia.

== Pharmacology ==
=== Pharmacokinetics ===
The long elimination half-life of approximately 28–32 days supports the extended dosing intervals, making it more convenient compared to traditional factor VIII replacement therapy, which typically requires more frequent administration.

=== Mechanism of action ===
Emicizumab is a bispecific antibody that simultaneously binds to activated coagulation factor IX (FIXa) and factor X (FX), bringing these coagulation factors into spatial proximity to facilitate the activation of factor X. This mechanism mimics the natural cofactor function of activated factor VIII (FVIIIa) in the coagulation cascade, effectively replacing the missing or deficient clotting factor in patients with hemophilia A.

Unlike traditional factor VIII replacement therapy, emicizumab functions independently of factor VIII levels and is not neutralized by factor VIII inhibitors. This unique mechanism makes it particularly valuable for patients who have developed inhibitory antibodies against factor VIII, a complication that affects approximately 20-30% of patients with severe hemophilia A.

== Research ==
A Phase I clinical trial found that it was well tolerated by healthy subjects.

Studies indicate that emicizumab is a better therapy compared to the previous generations, due to subcutaneous administration and fewer injections, which reduces injection site reactions and makes therapy less troublesome.

=== HAVEN clinical trial program ===
Emicizumab was evaluated in one of the largest pivotal clinical trial programs in hemophilia A, comprising four pivotal Phase III studies known as the HAVEN trials.

==== HAVEN 1 study ====
HAVEN 1 was a randomized, multicenter, open-label Phase III trial that included 109 male patients (ages 12–75 years) with severe hemophilia A and factor VIII inhibitors. The study demonstrated that emicizumab prophylaxis significantly reduced bleeding episodes compared to no prophylaxis in patients with inhibitors.

==== HAVEN 3 study ====
HAVEN 3 evaluated emicizumab in patients with severe hemophilia A without factor VIII inhibitors. The trial demonstrated that subcutaneous emicizumab prophylaxis, administered either once weekly or every two weeks, resulted in bleeding rates that were significantly lower by more than 95% compared to no prophylaxis. More than 55% of participants in each randomized emicizumab regimen experienced no treated bleeds during the study period.

=== Additional HAVEN studies ===
The clinical program also included HAVEN 2 (pediatric patients with inhibitors) and HAVEN 4 (patients switching from bypassing agent prophylaxis), further establishing the efficacy and safety profile of emicizumab across different patient populations.

== Regulatory approvals ==
Emicizumab received its first regulatory approval from the FDA on November 16, 2017, under the brand name Hemlibra for routine prophylaxis in adult and pediatric patients with hemophilia A who have developed factor VIII inhibitors. This approval was based on results from the HAVEN 1 and HAVEN 2 clinical trials.

On October 4, 2018, the FDA expanded the approval under the Breakthrough Therapy designation to include all adult and pediatric patients (newborn and older) with hemophilia A, regardless of inhibitor status. This expanded approval was based on data from the HAVEN 3 and HAVEN 4 studies.

Emicizumab has since received regulatory approvals in numerous countries worldwide, including approval by the European Medicines Agency (EMA) and other international regulatory authorities.

== See also ==
- Factor VIII
- Bispecific antibody
- Coagulation cascade
- Factor VIII medication
