= Alexion =

1st-century BC Greek physician

Alexion (died 44 BCE) was an ancient physician. His name and profession are known from a lamentation on his sudden death, authored by his close friend Cicero. His name suggests that he was Greek.
