= Gantenerumab =

Monoclonal antibody protein

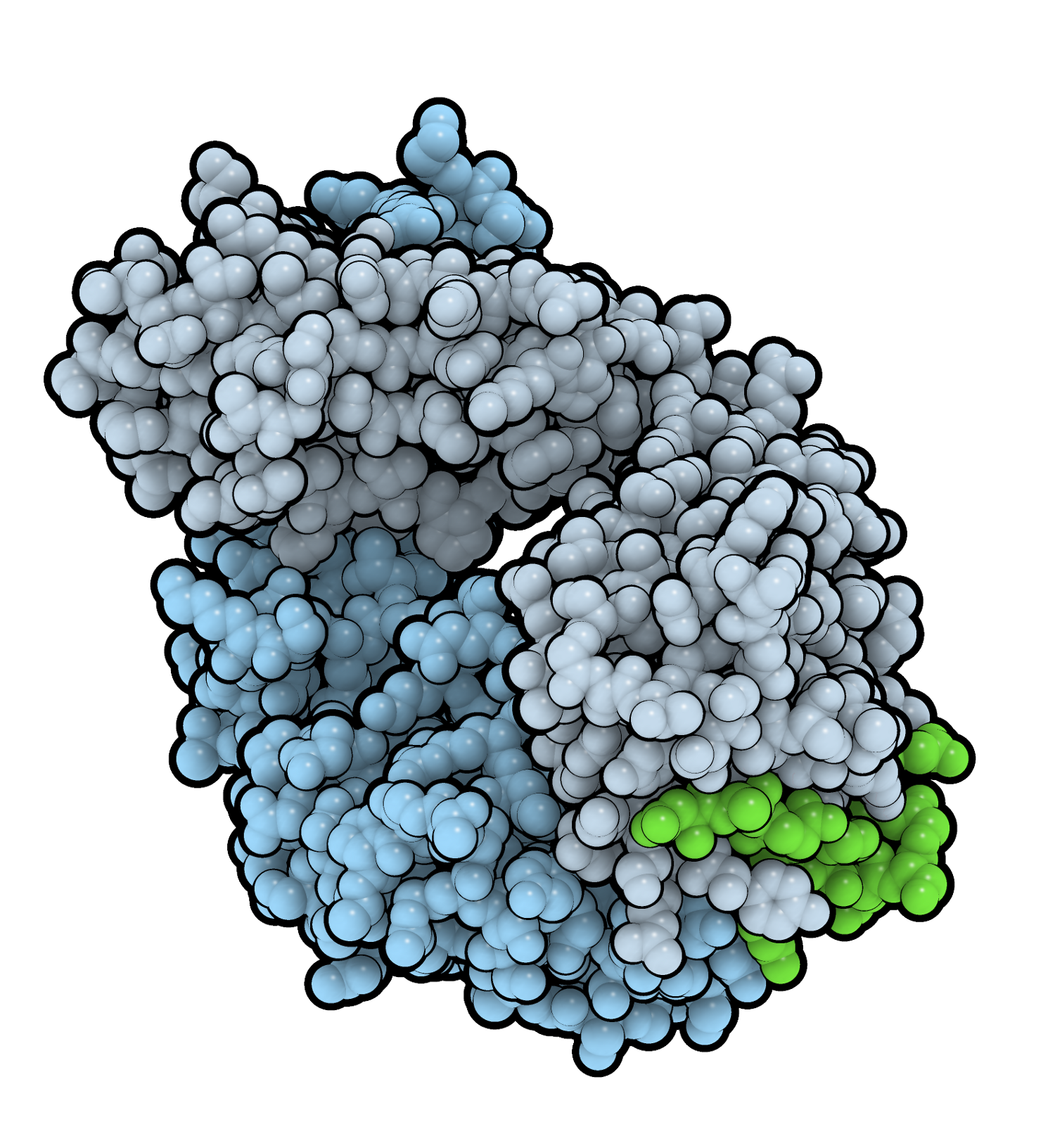
- Fab fragment of gantenerumab (blue) encircling and binding an Aβ(1–11) fibril (bright green). PDB: 5CSZ.

Monoclonal antibody
- Type: Whole antibody
- Source: Human
- Target: Beta-amyloid (Aβ40/42)

Clinical data
- ATC code: none

Legal status
- Legal status: Investigational

Identifiers
- CAS Number: 1043556-46-2
- ChemSpider: none
- UNII: 4DF060P933
- KEGG: D09680

Chemical and physical data
- Formula: C_{6496}H_{10072}N_{1740}O_{2024}S_{42}
- Molar mass: 146276.71 g·mol^{−1}

Gantenerumab is a monoclonal antibody for the treatment of Alzheimer's disease being developed by Hoffmann-La Roche pharmaceuticals.

Gantenerumab binds to and clears aggregated beta amyloid fibers.

A phase III clinical trial of gantenerumab was stopped early because of a lack of efficacy. Gantenerumab was also evaluated in younger patients at high risk of developing Alzheimer's disease but after five years of treatment, the drug did little to slow cognitive decline in patients.

A study published in 2025 suggests that Gantenerumab appears to reduce the risk of Alzheimer's-related dementia in people with rare genetic mutations that cause the overproduction of amyloid in the brain. These people are normally destined to develop the disease in their 30s, 40s or 50s.

Gantenerumab has been further developed into trontinemab, which started a Phase III trial in 2025. Trontinemab consists of gantenerumab fused to Roche's proprietary Brainshuttle module to help it cross the blood–brain barrier.
