= Antibody fragment =

An antibody split into Fab and Fc fragments

An antibody fragment can be:

- a fragment antigen-binding (Fab)
- a fragment crystallizable (Fc)
