= Zenocutuzumab =

Medication

Monoclonal antibody
- Type: Whole antibody
- Source: Humanized
- Target: HER2, HER3

Clinical data
- Pronunciation: /ˌzɛnoʊkjuːˈtuːzuːmæb/ ZEN-oh-kyoo-TOOZ-oo-mab
- Trade names: Bizengri
- Other names: MCLA-128, zenocutuzumab-zbco
- License data: US DailyMed: Zenocutuzumab
- Routes of administration: Intravenous
- Drug class: Antineoplastic
- ATC code: None

Legal status
- Legal status: US: ℞-only

Identifiers
- CAS Number: 1969309-56-5
- DrugBank: DB15559
- UNII: AE72RB1W1X
- KEGG: D11991

Chemical and physical data
- Formula: C_{6479}H_{9971}N_{1725}O_{2027}S_{45}
- Molar mass: 145904.79 g·mol^{−1}

Zenocutuzumab, sold under the brand name Bizengri, is a humanized monoclonal antibody used for the treatment of non-small cell lung cancer or pancreatic cancer. It is a low-fucose humanized full-length immunoglobulin G1 bispecific HER2- and HER3-directed antibody.

The most common adverse reactions include diarrhea, musculoskeletal pain, fatigue, nausea, infusion-related reactions, dyspnea, rash, constipation, vomiting, abdominal pain, and edema. The most common grade 3 or 4 laboratory abnormalities include increased gamma-glutamyl transferase, decreased hemoglobin, decreased sodium, and decreased platelets.

Zenocutuzumab was approved for medical use in the United States in December 2024. It is the first approval by the US Food and Drug Administration (FDA) of a systemic therapy for people with non-small cell lung cancer or pancreatic adenocarcinoma harboring an neuregulin 1 gene fusion. The FDA considers it to be a first-in-class medication.

== Medical uses ==
Zenocutuzumab is indicated for the treatment of adults with advanced, unresectable or metastatic non-small cell lung cancer harboring a neuregulin 1 gene fusion with disease progression on or after prior systemic therapy; adults with advanced, unresectable or metastatic pancreatic adenocarcinoma harboring a neuregulin 1 gene fusion with disease progression on or after prior systemic therapy.

== Adverse effects ==
The US Food and Drug Administration prescribing information for zenocutuzumab includes a boxed warning for embryo-fetal toxicity.

== History ==
Efficacy was evaluated in the eNRGy study (NCT02912949), a multicenter, open-label, multicohort trial. The trial enrolled 64 adults with advanced or metastatic neuregulin 1 gene fusion-positive non-small cell lung cancer and 30 adults with advanced or metastatic neuregulin 1 gene fusion-positive pancreatic adenocarcinoma who had disease progression following standard of care treatment. Identification of positive neuregulin 1 gene fusion status was prospectively determined by next generation sequencing assays.

The US Food and Drug Administration granted the application for Zenocutuzumab priority review, breakthrough therapy, and orphan drug designations.

== Society and culture ==
=== Legal status ===
Zenocutuzumab was approved for medical use in the United States in December 2024.

=== Names ===
Zenocutuzumab is the international nonproprietary name, and the United States Adopted Name.
