= Epcoritamab =

Medication

Monoclonal antibody
- Type: Bi-specific T-cell engager
- Source: Humanized
- Target: CD3E, CD20

Clinical data
- Trade names: Epkinly, Tepkinly
- Other names: GEN3013, epcoritamab-bysp
- AHFS/Drugs.com: Monograph
- MedlinePlus: a623023
- License data: US DailyMed: Epcoritamab
- Routes of administration: Subcutaneous
- Drug class: Antineoplastic
- ATC code: L01FX27 (WHO)

Legal status
- Legal status: CA: ℞-only / Schedule D; US: ℞-only; EU: Rx-only

Identifiers
- CAS Number: 2134641-34-0
- DrugBank: DB16672
- UNII: D6OMY2L0WA
- KEGG: D12368

Chemical and physical data
- Formula: C_{6471}H_{9999}N_{1735}O_{2007}S_{44}
- Molar mass: 145624.95 g·mol^{−1}

Epcoritamab, sold under the brand name Epkinly among others, is a Bi-specific T-cell engager (BiTE) used for the treatment of diffuse large B-cell lymphoma. Epcoritamab is a bispecific CD20-directed CD3 T-cell engager. Epcoritamab was co-developed by AbbVie and Genmab.

Epcoritamab was approved for medical use in the United States in May 2023, in the European Union in September 2023, and in Canada in December 2023.

== Medical uses ==
Epcoritamab is indicated for the treatment of adults with relapsed or refractory diffuse large B-cell lymphoma not otherwise specified, including diffuse large B-cell lymphoma arising from indolent lymphoma, and high-grade B-cell lymphoma after two or more lines of systemic therapy.

In June 2024, the US Food and Drug Administration (FDA) expanded the indication to include the treatment of adults with relapsed or refractory follicular lymphoma after two or more lines of systemic therapy.

In November 2025, the FDA approved epcoritamab with lenalidomide and rituximab for relapsed or refractory follicular lymphoma. The FDA also granted traditional approval to epcoritamab as monotherapy for relapsed or refractory follicular lymphoma after two or more lines of systemic therapy (epcoritamab was granted accelerated approval for this indication in 2024).

== Side effects ==
The US prescribing information includes a boxed warning for serious or fatal cytokine release syndrome and immune effector cell-associated neurotoxicity. Warnings and precautions include serious infections and cytopenias.

The most common adverse reactions include cytokine release syndrome, fatigue, musculoskeletal pain, injection site reactions, pyrexia, abdominal pain, nausea, and diarrhea.

== History ==
Epcoritamab was evaluated in the EPCORE NHL-1 (NCT03625037) trial in 148 participants with relapsed or refractory B-cell lymphoma after two or more lines of systemic therapy, including at least one anti-CD20 monoclonal antibody-containing therapy.

For the treatement of follicular lymphoma, the efficacy and safety were evaluated in EPCORE NHL-1 (Study GCT3013-01; NCT03625037), an open-label, multi-cohort, multicenter, single-arm trial that included 127 participants with relapsed or refractory FL after at least two lines of systemic therapy. The primary efficacy and safety were based on 127 participants who received a two step-up dosing regimen. A separate dose optimization cohort of 86 participants evaluated the recommended 3-step up dosage schedule for cytokine release syndrome mitigation.

The US Food and Drug Administration (FDA) granted the application for epcoritamab for follicular lymphoma priority review and breakthrough therapy designations.

Approval of epcoritamab with lenalidomide and rituximab was based on EPCORE FL-1 (study M20-638; NCT05409066), a randomized, open-label trial that enrolled 488 participants with relapsed or refractory FL. Participants were randomized (1:1) to receive epcoritamab-bysp plus R2 or R2 alone. Participants had a median of one prior line of systemic therapy (range: 1 to 7); 24% and 17% had two and three or more prior lines, respectively.

== Society and culture ==
=== Legal status ===
In July 2023, the Committee for Medicinal Products for Human Use of the European Medicines Agency recommended a conditional marketing authorization for epcoritamab (Tepkinly). It was authorized for medical use in the European Union in September 2023. The EMA granted orphan drug designation to epcoritamab in both February and June 2022.

=== Names ===
Epcoritamab is the international nonproprietary name.

Epcoritamab is sold under the brand names Epkinly and Tepkinly.
