= Tarlatamab =

Monoclonal antibody

Monoclonal antibody
- Type: Bi-specific T-cell engager
- Source: Human
- Target: DLL3 and CD3

Clinical data
- Trade names: Imdelltra, Imdylltra
- Other names: AMG757; AMG-757, tarlatamab-dlle
- AHFS/Drugs.com: Monograph
- MedlinePlus: a624037
- License data: US DailyMed: Tarlatamab
- Routes of administration: Intravenous
- Drug class: Antineoplastic
- ATC code: L01FX33 (WHO)

Legal status
- Legal status: CA: ℞-only / Schedule D; US: ℞-only; EU: Rx-only

Identifiers
- CAS Number: 2307488-83-9
- DrugBank: DB17256
- UNII: 74X82ST8Q1
- KEGG: D12234

Chemical and physical data
- Formula: C_{4664}H_{7139}N_{1259}O_{1454}S_{34}
- Molar mass: 105202.82 g·mol^{−1}

Tarlatamab, sold under the brand name Imdelltra among others, is an anti-cancer medication used for the treatment of extensive-stage small cell lung cancer. It is a bispecific T-cell engager that binds delta-like ligand 3 and CD3.

The most common adverse reactions include cytokine release syndrome, fatigue, pyrexia, dysgeusia, decreased appetite, musculoskeletal pain, and constipation, anemia and nausea.

Tarlatamab was approved for medical use in the United States in May 2024. The US Food and Drug Administration (FDA) considers it to be a first-in-class medication.

== Medical uses ==
Tarlatamab is indicated for the treatment of adults with extensive stage small cell lung cancer with disease progression on or after platinum-based chemotherapy.

== Adverse effects ==
The US prescribing information for tarlatamab includes a boxed warning for life-threatening or fatal cytokine release syndrome and neurologic toxicity, including immune effector cell-associated neurotoxicity syndrome, as well as warnings and precautions for cytopenias, infections, hepatotoxicity, hypersensitivity, and embryo-fetal toxicity.

The most common adverse reactions include cytokine release syndrome, fatigue, pyrexia, dysgeusia, decreased appetite, musculoskeletal pain, and constipation, anemia and nausea. The most common grade 3 or 4 laboratory abnormalities include decreased lymphocytes, decreased sodium, increased uric acid, decreased total neutrophils, decreased hemoglobin, increased activated partial thromboplastin time, and decreased potassium.

== History ==
Efficacy was evaluated in 99 participants with relapsed/refractory extensive stage small cell lung cancer with disease progression following platinum-based chemotherapy enrolled in DeLLphi-301 [NCT05060016], an open-label, multicenter, multi-cohort study. Participants with symptomatic brain metastases, interstitial lung disease or non-infectious pneumonitis, and active immunodeficiency were excluded. Participants received tarlatamab until disease progression or unacceptable toxicity.

The US Food and Drug Administration (FDA) granted the application for tarlatamab priority review, breakthrough therapy, and orphan drug designations.

Efficacy was evaluated in DeLLphi-304 (NCT05740566), a multi-center, randomized, open-label trial in people with small cell lung cancer with disease progression following treatment with platinum-based chemotherapy with or without an anti-PD-(L)1 antibody. In DeLLphi-304, 509 participants were randomized (1:1) to receive either tarlatamab-dlle or the investigator's choice of standard of care chemotherapy (topotecan, lurbinectedin, or amrubicin) until disease progression or unacceptable toxicity.

In November 2025, the FDA granted traditional approval to tarlatamab for adults with extensive stage small cell lung cancer with disease progression on or after platinum-based chemotherapy. Tarlatamab received accelerated approval for this indication in 2024.

== Society and culture ==
=== Legal status ===
Tarlatamab was approved for medical use in the United States in May 2024.

=== Names ===
Tarlatamab is the international nonproprietary name and the United States Adopted Name.

Tarlatamab is sold under the brand name Imdelltra.
