= DLL3 =

Protein-coding gene in the species Homo sapiens

Identifiers
- Aliases: DLL3, SCDO1, pu, pudgy, delta like canonical Notch ligand 3
- External IDs: OMIM: 602768; MGI: 1096877; GeneCards: DLL3

Gene location (Human)
Chr.	Chromosome 19 (human)
Band	19q13.2	Start	39,498,895 bp
Band	19q13.2	End	39,508,481 bp

Gene location (Mouse)
Chr.	Chromosome 7 (mouse)
Band	7 A3|7 16.67 cM	Start	27,992,978 bp
Band	7 A3|7 16.67 cM	End	28,001,663 bp
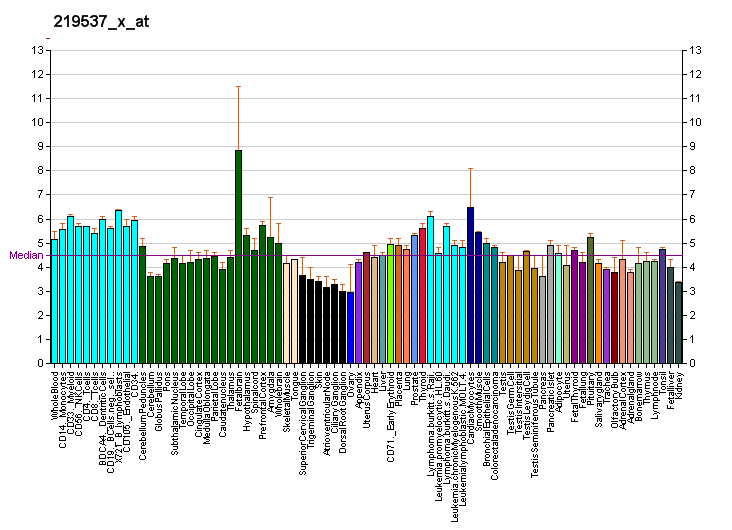
RNA expression pattern
Bgee	Human / Mouse (ortholog); Top expressed in: ganglionic eminence; gonad; testicle; ventricular zone; nucleus accumbens; amygdala; anterior cingulate cortex; prefrontal cortex; hypothalamus; putamen / Top expressed in: medial ganglionic eminence; seminiferous tubule; tail of embryo; primitive streak; embryo; embryo; epiblast; spermatid; morula; pars intermedia; More reference expression data
BioGPS	More reference expression data
Gene ontology
Molecular function	Notch binding; calcium ion binding
Cellular component	integral component of membrane; membrane; plasma membrane
Biological process	Notch signaling pathway; somitogenesis; multicellular organism development; negative regulation of neurogenesis; cell differentiation; compartment pattern specification; paraxial mesoderm development; tissue development; skeletal system development
Sources:Amigo / QuickGO
Orthologs
Databases	NCBI: entry; OMA: entry
Species	Human	Mouse
Entrez	10683	13389
Ensembl	ENSG00000090932	ENSMUSG00000003436
UniProt	Q9NYJ7	O88516
RefSeq (mRNA)	NM_016941; NM_203486	NM_007866
RefSeq (protein)	NP_058637; NP_982353	NP_031892
Location (UCSC)	Chr 19: 39.5 – 39.51 Mb	Chr 7: 27.99 – 28 Mb
PubMed search
- Wikidata
View/Edit Human	View/Edit Mouse

Delta-like 3 (Drosophila), also known as DLL3, is a protein which in humans is encoded by the DLL3 gene. Two transcript variants encoding distinct isoforms have been identified for this gene.

== Function ==
This gene encodes a member of the delta protein ligand family. This family functions as Notch ligands that are characterized by a DSL domain, EGF repeats, and a transmembrane domain. Expression of DLL3 is highest in fetal brain. It plays a key role in somitogenesis within the paraxial mesoderm.

== Clinical significance ==
Mutations in this gene cause the autosomal recessive genetic disorder Jarcho-Levin syndrome.

Experimental drugs targeting DLL3 have also been investigated as possible treatments for certain types of lung and neuroendocrine cancer, Tarlatamab and rovalpituzumab tesirine are two prominent examples.
