= T cell engager =

Class of artificial monoclonal antibodies

Structure of a BiTE. V_{H}: Heavy chain variable regions. V_{L}: Light chain variable regions. Different specificity is marked with different colours and shapes. The arrows point from N- to C-terminus.

T-cell engager (TCE) or bispecific T-cell engager (BiTE) is a class of artificial bispecific monoclonal antibodies that are investigated for use as anti-cancer drugs. They direct a host's immune system, more specifically the T cells' cytotoxic activity, against cancer cells. BiTE is a registered trademark of Micromet AG (fully owned subsidiary of Amgen Inc).

TCE molecules are fusion proteins consisting of two single-chain variable fragments (scFvs) of different antibodies, or amino acid sequences from four different genes, on a single peptide chain of about 55 kilodaltons. One of the scFvs binds to T cells via the CD3 receptor, and the other to a tumor cell via a tumor specific molecule.

== Mechanism of action ==
A BiTE linking a T cell to a tumor cell.

Like other bispecific antibodies, and unlike ordinary monoclonal antibodies, TCEs form a link between T cells and tumor cells. This causes T cells to exert cytotoxic activity on tumor cells by producing proteins like perforin and granzymes, independently of the presence of MHC I or co-stimulatory molecules. These proteins enter tumor cells and initiate the cell's apoptosis.

This action mimics physiological processes observed during T cell attacks against tumor cells.

== TCEs in clinical assessment or with clinical approvals ==
Several TCEs are currently in preclinical and clinical trials to assess their therapeutic efficacy and safety.

=== Blinatumomab ===
Blinatumomab, sold under the brand name Blincyto, links T cells with CD19 receptors found on the surface of B cells. In June 2014, the Food and Drug Administration (US) approved blinatumomab for adults with Philadelphia chromosome-negative relapsed or refractory acute lymphoblastic leukemia, while the European Medicines Agency gave authorisation for its use in November 2015.

=== Glofitamab ===
It is a bispecific CD20-directed CD3 T-cell engager. It was approved for medical use in Canada in March 2023, in the United States in June 2023, and in the European Union in July 2023.

=== Mosunetuzumab ===
Bispecifically binds CD20 and CD3 to engage T-cells. Mosunetuzumab was approved for medical use in the European Union in June 2022.

=== Solitomab ===
Solitomab links T cells with the EpCAM antigen which is expressed by colon, gastric, prostate, ovarian, lung, and pancreatic cancers.

=== Talquetamab ===
Talquetamab, sold under the brand name Talvey, is a humanized monoclonal antibody used for the treatment of multiple myeloma. It is a bispecific GPRC5D-directed CD3 T-cell engager. Talquetamab is a bispecific antibody against two targets: human CD3, a T-cell surface antigen, and human G-protein coupled receptor family C group 5 member D (GPRC5D), a tumor-associated antigen with potential antineoplastic activity. Talquetamab binds both targets, drawing the T cells close to the tumor cells, causing a cytotoxic T-lymphocyte response. It is being developed by Janssen Pharmaceuticals.

The most common adverse reactions include cytokine release syndrome, dysgeusia, nail disorder, musculoskeletal pain, skin disorder, rash, fatigue, decreased weight, dry mouth, pyrexia, xerosis, dysphagia, upper respiratory tract infection, and diarrhea.

Talquetamab was approved for medical use in both the United States and the European Union in August 2023. The US Food and Drug Administration (FDA) considers it to be a first-in-class medication.

=== Tarlatamab ===
Tarlatamab, sold under the brand name Imdelltra among others, is an anti-cancer medication used for the treatment of extensive-stage small cell lung cancer. It is a bispecific T-cell engager that binds delta-like ligand 3 and CD3.

The most common adverse reactions include cytokine release syndrome, fatigue, pyrexia, dysgeusia, decreased appetite, musculoskeletal pain, and constipation, anemia and nausea.

Tarlatamab was approved for medical use in the United States in May 2024. The US Food and Drug Administration (FDA) considers it to be a first-in-class medication.

=== Tebentafusp ===
After clinical trials, in January 2022, the US FDA approved tebentafusp (a BiTE targeting the gp100 peptide) for HLA-A*02:01-positive adult patients with unresectable or metastatic uveal melanoma.

tebentafusp uses the -fusp word stem for fusion proteins as it is not purely made up of antibody pieces. Instead, it is the fusion of three pieces: T cell receptor α chain (synthetic human), T cell receptor β chain (synthetic human), and anti-(human cd3 antigen) immunoglobulin (synthetic scFv fragment). Specifically, it uses the T cell receptor part to bind to a fragment of gp100 presented by HLA-A*02:01 and the ScFv part to bind to CD3.

=== Epcoritamab ===
Epcoritamab, sold under the brand names Epkinly & Tepkinly, is used for the treatment of diffuse large B-cell lymphoma. Epcoritamab is a bispecific CD20-directed CD3 T-cell engager.

Epcoritamab was approved for medical use in the United States in May 2023, in the European Union in September 2023, in the UK in October 2023 and in Canada in December 2023.

=== VIR-5500 ===
VIR-5500 is a TCE that targets PSMA and CD3. It incorporates 'PRO-XTEN®' masking to reduce toxicity by confining the activity to the tumor microenvironment, where the mask is cleaved off by tumor-specific proteases. It was in the news during its phase one trial for reducing PSA (a biomarker) in 58 men with metastatic prostate cancer.

== Further research ==
Utilizing the same technology, melanoma (with MCSP specific TCEs) and acute myeloid leukemia (with CD33 specific TCEs) can be targeted. As of 2008, research in this area is active.

Another avenue for novel anti-cancer therapies is re-engineering some of the currently used conventional antibodies like trastuzumab (targeting HER2/neu), cetuximab and panitumumab (both targeting the EGF receptor), using the TCE approach.

As of 2009, BiTEs against CD66e and EphA2 are being developed as well.
