= Catumaxomab =

Monoclonal antibody

Monoclonal antibody
- Type: Trifunctional antibody
- Source: Rat/mouse hybrid
- Target: EpCAM, CD3

Clinical data
- Trade names: Removab, others
- AHFS/Drugs.com: International Drug Names
- Routes of administration: intraperitoneal infusion
- ATC code: L01FX03 (WHO)

Legal status
- Legal status: EU: Rx-only; In general: ℞ (Prescription only)

Identifiers
- CAS Number: 509077-98-9
- DrugBank: DB06607
- ChemSpider: none
- UNII: M2HPV837HO

Catumaxomab, sold under the brand name Removab among others, is a rat-mouse hybrid monoclonal antibody which is used to treat malignant ascites, a condition occurring in people with metastasizing cancer. It binds to antigens CD3 and EpCAM. It was developed by Fresenius Biotech and Trion Pharma (Germany).

== Medical use ==
In the European Union, catumaxomab is indicated for the intraperitoneal treatment of malignant ascites in adults with epithelial cellular adhesion molecule (EpCAM)-positive carcinomas, who are not eligible for further systemic anticancer therapy. Ascites is an accumulation of fluid in the peritoneal cavity.

== Adverse effects ==
Common adverse effects include fever, nausea and vomiting. Fever and pain should be controlled by giving NSAIDs, analgetics or antipyretics before application of catumaxomab. All side effects were fully reversible in studies. Most are caused by the liberation of cytokines.

== Mechanism of action ==

Many types of cancer cells carry EpCAM (epithelial cell adhesion molecule) on their surface. By binding to such a cell via one arm, to a T lymphocyte via the other arm and to an antigen-presenting cell like a macrophage, a natural killer cell or a dendritic cell via the heavy chains, an immunological reaction against the cancer cell is triggered. Removing cancer cells from the abdominal cavity reduces the tumour burden which is seen as the cause for ascites in people with cancer.

== Chemical structure ==
Catumaxomab consists of one "half" (one heavy chain and one light chain) of an anti-EpCAM antibody and one half of an anti-CD3 antibody, so that each molecule of catumaxomab can bind both EpCAM and CD3. In addition, the Fc-region can bind to an Fc receptor on accessory cells like other antibodies, which has led to calling the drug a trifunctional antibody.

== History ==
Catumaxomab was developed by Trion Pharma, based on preliminary work by the Helmholtz Zentrum München. Dr. Horst Lindhofer is listed at the primary inventor of the patent. Fresenius Biotech conducted clinical trials and filed the drug for approval with the European Medicines Agency (EMA). It was approved in Europe on 20 April 2009. In 2013, catumaxomab was voluntarily withdrawn from the US market and in 2017 in the EU market for commercial reasons. The product has not been marketed in the EU since 2014.

== Society and culture ==
=== Legal status ===
In October 2024, the Committee for Medicinal Products for Human Use of the European Medicines Agency adopted a positive opinion, recommending the granting of a marketing authorization for the medicinal product Korjuny, intended for the intraperitoneal treatment of malignant ascites. The applicant for this medicinal product is Lindis Biotech GmbH. Catumaxomab was approved for medical use in the European Union in February 2025.
