= Antibody-dependent cellular cytotoxicity =

Cell-mediated killing of other cells mediated by antibodies

Antibody-dependent cellular cytotoxicity

Antibody-dependent cellular cytotoxicity (ADCC), also referred to as antibody-dependent cell-mediated cytotoxicity, is a mechanism of cell-mediated immune defense whereby an effector cell of the immune system kills a target cell, whose membrane-surface antigens have been bound by specific antibodies. It is one of the mechanisms through which antibodies, as part of the humoral immune response, can act to limit and contain infection.

ADCC is independent of the immune complement system that also lyses targets but does not require any other cell. ADCC requires an effector cell which classically is known to be natural killer (NK) cells that typically interact with immunoglobulin G (IgG) antibodies. However, macrophages, neutrophils and eosinophils can also mediate ADCC, such as eosinophils killing certain parasitic worms known as helminths via IgE antibodies.

In general, ADCC has typically been described as the immune response to antibody-coated cells leading ultimately to the lysing of the infected or non-host cell. In recent literature, its importance in regards to treatment of cancerous cells and deeper insight into its deceptively complex pathways have been topics of increasing interest to medical researchers.

== NK cells ==
The typical ADCC involves activation of NK cells by antibodies in a multi-tiered progression of immune control. A NK cell expresses Fcγ receptors. These receptors recognize and bind to the reciprocal portion of an antibody, such as IgG, which binds to the surface of a pathogen-infected target cell. The most common of these Fc receptors on the surface of an NK cell is CD16 or FcγRIII. Once the Fc receptor binds to the Fc region of the antibody, the NK cell releases cytotoxic factors that cause the death of the target cell.

During replication of a virus, some of the viral proteins are expressed on the cell surface membrane of the infected cell. Antibodies can then bind to these viral proteins. Next, the NK cells which have reciprocal Fcγ receptors will bind to that antibody, inducing the NK cell to release proteins such as perforin and proteases known as granzymes, which cause lysis of the infected cell to hinder the spread of the virus.

== Eosinophils ==
Large parasites like helminths are too big to be engulfed and killed by phagocytosis. They also have an external structure or integument that is resistant to attack by substances released by neutrophils and macrophages. After IgE coat these parasites, the Fc receptor (FcɛRI) of an eosinophil will recognize IgE. Subsequently, interaction between FcεRI and the Fc portion of helminth-bound IgE signals the eosinophil to degranulate.

== In vitro assays ==
Several laboratory methods exist for determining the efficacy of antibodies or effector cells in eliciting ADCC. Usually, a target cell line expressing a certain surface-exposed antigen is incubated with antibody specific for that antigen. After washing, effector cells expressing Fc receptor CD16 are co-incubated with the antibody-labelled target cells. Effector cells are typically PBMCs (peripheral blood mononuclear cell), of which a small percentage are NK cells (natural killer cell); less often they are purified NK cells themselves. Over the course of a few hours a complex forms between the antibody, target cell, and effector cell which leads to lysis of the cell membrane of the target. If the target cell was pre-loaded with a label of some sort, that label is released in proportion to the amount of cell lysis. Cytotoxicity can be quantified by measuring the amount of label in solution compared to the amount of label that remains within healthy, intact cells.

The classical method of detecting this is the chromium-51 [^{51}Cr] release assay; the sulfur-35 [^{35}S] release assay is a little used radioisotope-based alternative. Target cell lysis is determined by measuring the amount of radiolabel released into the cell culture medium by means of a gamma counter or scintillation counter. A variety of non-radioactive methods are now in widespread use. Fluorescence-based methods include such things as direct labelling with a fluorescent dye like calcein or labelling with europium that becomes fluorescent when released Eu^{3+} binds to a chelator. Fluorescence can be measured by means of multi-well fluorometers or by flow cytometry methods. There are also enzymatic-based assays in which the contents of the lysed cells includes cellular enzymes like GAPDH that remain active; supplying a substrate for that enzyme can catalyze a reaction whose product can be detected by luminescence or by absorbance.

== Medical applications ==
NK cells are involved in killing tumor cells and other cells that may lack MHC I on their surface, indicating a non-self cell. NK cells have been shown to behave similarly to memory cells due to their ability to react to destroy non-host cells only after interacting with a host cell. As NK cells are not themselves specific to certain pathways of immune control, they are utilized a majority of the time in ADCC as a less discriminate cell destroyer than antibody-specific apoptosis mechanisms. The ability of activated ex vivo NK cells has been a topic of interest for the treatment of tumors. After early clinical trials involving activation through cytokines produced poor results and severe toxicological side effects, more recent studies have produced success in regulating metastatic tumors using interleukin proteins to activate the NK cell.

The effects against solid tumors of trastuzumab and rituximab monoclonal antibodies have been shown in experiments with mice to involve ADCC as an important mechanism of therapeutic action. In the clinic, the FcgRIII 158V/F polymorphism interfere with the ability to generate ADCC responses in vitro during trastuzumab treatment.

Multiple myeloma can be treated with daratumumab (Darzalex) monoclonal antibody. Studies with in vitro materials and patient materials indicate that ADCC is an important mechanism, along with CDC (complement-dependent cytotoxicity).

ADCC as used in immune control is typically more useful for viral infections than bacterial infections due to IgG antibodies binding to virus-related antigens over prokaryotic cells. Instead of ADCC removing outside toxins, immunoglobulins neutralize products of infecting bacteria and encase infected host cells that have had bacterial toxins directly inserted through the cell membrane.

ADCC is also important in the use of vaccines, as creation of antibodies and the destruction of antigens introduced to the host body are crucial to building immunity through small exposure to viral and bacterial proteins. Examples of this include vaccines targeting repeats in toxins (RTX) that are structurally crucial to a wide variety of erythrocyte-lysing bacteria, described as hemolysins. These bacteria target the CD18 portion of leukocytes, which has historically been shown to impact ADCC in adhesion-deficient cells.

== See also ==
- Afucosylated monoclonal antibodies
