= Fragment crystallizable region =

Tail region of an antibody

An antibody digested by papain yields three fragments, two Fab fragments and one Fc fragment

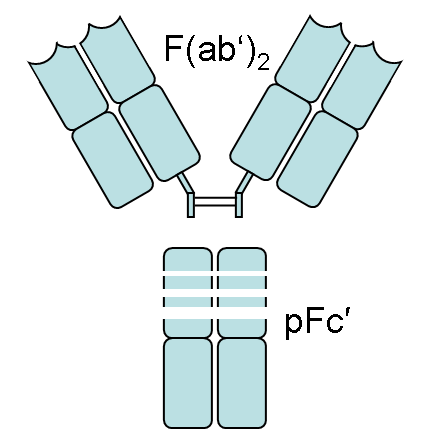
An antibody digested by pepsin yields two fragments: a F(ab')_{2} fragment and a pFc' fragment

The fragment crystallizable region (Fc region) is the tail region of an antibody that interacts with cell surface receptors called Fc receptors and some proteins of the complement system. This region allows antibodies to activate the immune system, for example, through binding to Fc receptors. In IgG, IgA and IgD antibody isotypes, the Fc region is composed of two identical protein fragments, derived from the second and third constant domains of the antibody's two heavy chains; IgM and IgE Fc regions contain three heavy chain constant domains (C_{H} domains 2–4) in each polypeptide chain. The Fc regions of IgGs bear a highly conserved N-glycosylation site. Glycosylation of the Fc fragment is essential for Fc receptor-mediated activity. The N-glycans attached to this site are predominantly core-fucosylated diantennary structures of the complex type. In addition, small amounts of these N-glycans also bear bisecting GlcNAc and α-2,6 linked sialic acid residues.

The other part of an antibody, called the Fab region, contains variable sections that define the specific target that the antibody can bind. By contrast, the Fc region of all antibodies in a class are the same for each species; they are constant rather than variable. The Fc region is, therefore, sometimes incorrectly termed the "fragment constant region".

Fc binds to various cell receptors and complement proteins. In this way, it mediates different physiological effects of antibodies (detection of opsonized particles; cell lysis; degranulation of mast cells, basophils, and eosinophils; and other processes).

== Engineered Fc fragments ==
In a new development in the field of antibody-based therapeutics, the Fc region of immunoglobulins has been engineered to contain an antigen-binding site. This type of antigen-binding fragment is called Fcab. Fcab fragments can be inserted into a full immunoglobulin by swapping the Fc region, thus obtaining a bispecific antibody (with both Fab and Fcab regions containing distinct binding sites). These bispecific monoclonal antibodies are sometimes referred to as mAb^{2} (also mAb-square).

== See also ==
- Antibody
- Fab region
- Protein tag
