= Monoclonal B-cell lymphocytosis =

- Other names: monoclonal lymphocytosis of undetermined significance
- Specialty: Hematology, oncology
- Symptoms: None
- Complications: May progress to chronic lymphocytic leukemia or certain lymphoma types; increased risk of developing non-hematologic cancers, serious infections, and kidney disease
- Duration: chronic
- Types: CLL/SLL, atypical CLL/SLL, non-CLL/SLL, and MBL-MZ

Monoclonal B-cell lymphocytosis (MBL) is an asymptomatic condition in which individuals have increased blood levels of particular subtypes of monoclonal lymphocytes (i.e. an aberrant and potentially malignant group of lymphocytes produced by a single ancestral cell). This increase must persist for at least 3 months. The lymphocyte subtypes are B-cells that share certain features with the abnormal clones of lymphocytes that circulate in chronic lymphocytic leukemia/small lymphocyte lymphoma (CLL/SLL) or, less frequently, other types of B-cell malignancies. Some individuals with these circulating B-cells develop CLL/SLL or the lymphoma types indicated by their circulating monoclonal B-cells. Hence, MBL is a premalignant disorder

In 2017, the World Health Organization (WHO) reclassified MBL as a distinct entity in which individuals have: 1) an excessive number of circulating monoclonal B-cells; 2) lack evidence of lymphadenopathy, organomegaly, or other tissue involvements caused by these cells; 3) no features of any other B cell lymphoproliferative disease such as one of the B-cell lymphomas; and 4) evidence that these cells have either a CLL/SLL, atypical CLL/SLL, or non-CLL/SLL phenotype based on these cells' expression of certain marker proteins. A fourth MBL phenotype, monoclonal B-cell lymphocytosis-marginal zone (i.e. MBL-MZ) appears to be emerging as a distinct form of non-CLL/SLL MBL.

MBL consist of two groups: low-count MBL has blood B-cell counts <0.5x^{9} cells/liter (i.e. 0.5x^{9}/L) whereas high-count MBL has blood B-cell counts ≥0.5x^{9}/L but <5 billion/L. While low-count MBL does not progress to a malignant disease, high-count MBL does so at a rate of 1-2% per year. MLP-MZ is an exception to this rule in that it s usually associated with B-cell counts >3 billion/L and all cases, regardless of B cell counts, have a somewhat higher risk of progressing to a malignant stage.

The incidence of all MBL phenotypes increases with age and is strikingly high in the elderly. Below age 40, MBL's incidence is <1% of the general population in most countries but above this age it is found in ~10% of all individuals. The disorder's incidence in individuals >90 may be as high as 75%. Age along with B-cell blood counts, MBL phenotype, and certain genomic abnormalities in the monoclonal B cells are critical considerations in evaluating the clinical implications of MBL and its need for management.

== MBL phenotypes ==
MBL falls into three phenotypes that are distinguished based on the cell surface marker proteins which they express viz., the CLL/SLL, atypical CLL/SLL, and non-CLL/SLL phenotypes. These markers are: CD5, CD19, CD20, CD23, and immunoglobulins (Ig) (either Ig light chains or complete Ig, i.e. light chains bound to Ig heavy chains. Distinguishing between these phenotypes is important because they progress to different lymphocyte malignancies. The following table gives the markers for the three MBL phenotypes with (+) indicating the expression (either dim, moderate, or bright depending or the intensity of their expression), (−) indicating the absence of expression, and na indicating not applicable as determined using fluorescent probes that bind the marker proteins. Detection of fluorescent probe binding by the cells requires the use of flow cytometry preferably employing 6 to 8 different fluorescent probes that bind to different markers on 5 million cells from the patient's blood. The table also includes the percentage of MLB cases with the phenotype and the malignancies to which they progress.

MBL phenotype	CD5	CD19	CD20	CD23	Light chains or immunolboulins	percent with phenotype	potential malignancy complication
CLL/SLL MLB	+	+	+ (dim)	+	light chain Ig, either +, + (dim), or −	68-75%	CLL/SLL
Atypical CLL/SLL MLB	+	+	+ (bright)	− or +	complete Ig, either + (moderate) or + (bright)	~15%	mantle cell lymphoma, follicular lymphoma
Non-CLL/SLL MLB	either − or + (dim)	+	+	na	light chain Ig, either + (moderate) or + (bright)	~14%	splenic marginal zone lymphoma, splenic lymphoma/leukemia unclassifiable

=== Monoclonal B-cell lymphocytosis of the marginal zone ===
Cases of non-CLL/SLL MBL in which the monoclonal B cells do not express CD5, CD23, CD10, or CD103 but strongly express CD79B and light chain Ig have been tentatively designated as having monoclonal B-cell lymphocytosis of the marginal zone (i.e. CBL-MZ). This term is used because normal marginal zone B-cell lymphocytes express these markers. Individuals with CBL-MZ commonly present with: B-cell blood counts that are extremely high (>4.0 billion; range 3.0 billion/L to 37.1 billion/L);, represent a large percentage of cases that would otherwise be designated as non-CLL/SLL MLB; often have an IgM monoclonal gammopathy, i.e. high blood levels of a monoclonal IgM antibody; and in addition to the IgM gammopathy, other features that are seen in Waldenström's macroglobulinemia and IgM monoclonal gammopathy of undetermined significance. These individuals are more likely than those with other types of MBL to have their disorder progress to a malignancy. These malignancies appear to have been primarily marginal zone B-cell lymphomas of the splenic marginal zone B-cell, splenic lymphoma/leukemia unclassifiable, hairy cell leukemia, and possibly Waldenström's macroglobulinemia. MBL-MZ requires further studies to evaluate its frequencies, rate of progression to malignancy, and treatment.

== Pathophysiology ==
=== Genome abnormalities ===
Most studies on the genomic abnormalities in MBL did not distinguish between the disorder's phenotypes. However, familial studies have found that hereditary factors can contributor to the development of specifically CLL/SLL MLB. Of all the hematologic malignancies, CLL/SLL is the most likely to afflict multiple family members with estimates of familial CLL/SLL ranging from 6 to 10% of all CLL/SLL cases. About 18% of first-degree relatives of individuals with familial CLL/SLL and ~16% of the close relatives of patients with non-hereditary CLL/SLL have CLL/SLL MBL. These associations strongly suggest that inheritable genomic abnormalities contribute to the development of CLL/SLL MLB and, possibly, the progression of this disorder to CLL/SLL.

Chromosome abnormalities, single nucleotide polymorphisms (SNPs, i.e. substitutions of a single nucleotide in a DNA sequence at a specific position in the genome) and gene mutations, while each occurs in <15% of cases, are present in CLL/SLL MBL and to some extent are similar to those found in CLL/SLL. For example, position 21.33 to 22.2 on the long (i.e. "q" ) arm of chromosome 13 is a potential susceptibility locus for familial CLL/SLL. This locus has been identified not only in individuals with familial CLL/SLL but also in their blood relatives who have CLL/SLL MBL. More than 20 SNPs are confirmed risk factors for the development of CLL/SLL; at least 6 of these are also risk factors for CLL/SLL MBL. Finally, the following studies were done on individuals defined as having MBL but din not give its phenotype. Here, these patients are presumed to have the CLL/SLL MBL phenotype. Individuals with low-count and high-count MBL shared with CLL/SLL patients many genomic abnormalities including: deletions of the long arm (i.e. "q" arm) of chromosomes 11 and 13; deletion of the short arm (i.e. "p" arm) of chromosome 17; trisomy of chromosome 12; and mutations in NOTCH1, BIRC3, SF3B1, MYD88, ATM, and TP53 genes. In general, the presence and frequency of the mutations in high count MBL were closer than the low count MLB in resembling those in CLL/SLL. All three groups had mutations in the IGH@ region of chromosome 14. This region contains the complex gene that encodes the VDJ region of the heavy chain component of antibodies. Among these mutations, IVGH4-59/61 is most often mutated in low-count MBL while IGHV1-69, IGH2-5, IGHV3-23, IGH23-33, IGHV3-48, and IGHV4-34 are most often mutated in high-count MBL and CLL/SLL. Finally, genetic abnormalities such as the deletion of the q arm in chromosome 13 found in low count MBL are more commonly associated with a favorable prognosis in CLL/SLL while those found in high count MBL, e.g. deletions in the q arm of chromosome 11 or p arm of chromosome 17 are commonly associated with unfavorable prognoses in CLL/SLL.

Individuals with MBL-MZ have monoclonal B cell cells that bear complex and distinctive genomic abnormalities, such as deletions and translocations involving chromosome 7, presence of an isochromosome 17, and, rarely, mutations in the NOTCH2 and KLF2 genes. Some of these genomic abnormalities are similar to those found in splenic marginal zone lymphomas and some of the MBL-MZ patients that bore these abnormalities developed this lymphoma. The genetic abnormalities in atypical and non-CLL/SLL MBL have not been well-defined.

The cited studies suggest that there is a step-wise accumulation of genomic abnormalities that lead to CLL/SLL MBL and MBL-MZ and then to overt malignancy. It presumed that similar accumulations led to the development of atypical and non-Cll/SLL MLB and then to their respective malignancies. However, given the number and diversity of these abnormalities, it is unclear which are critical determinants of these disorders. A recent model based on laboratory studies of normal CD19+ B cell, monoclonal CLL/SLL MBL cells, and CLL/SLL malignant cells found that their accumulation of genomic abnormalities may be caused by progressively increasing: 1) double strand breaks in DNA, 2) activation of non-homologous end joining error-prone DNA repair mechanisms, and 3) consequential accumulation of genomic abnormalities which promote the clonal development, survival, proliferation, and ultimately malignancy of the involved B cells.

=== Infectious diseases ===
Studies have identified MBL in ~30% of patients infected with the hepatitis C virus, found increased risks of CLL/SLL-MLB in patients with pneumonia, and decreased risk of CLL/CSS MBL in patients who have been vaccinated for influenza or pneumonia. Herpes Zoster and various upper respiratory tract infections are also considered to be risk factors for developing CLL/SLL MBL. It seems possible that the pathogens involved in these diseases provide antigens that stimulate the development of MBL although further studies are required to explore this hypothesis further.

=== Blood transfusion ===
One study diagnosed MBL in 0.14% of blood donors and suggested a possibility that MBL is transmitted through blood transfusions. This concern as well as the concern of transmitting CLL/SLL in transfusions of blood from patients with CLL/SLL has been voiced elsewhere. However, a study conducted in Sweden and Denmark on 7,413 recipients of blood from 796 donors diagnosed with CLL/SLL found no evidence of CLL/SLL clustering among recipients of blood from these donors. It therefore appears that CLL/SLL and, by implication, CLL/SLL MBL have little or no ability to be transmitted by blood transfusions, at least when the donors and recipients are unrelated.

=== Bone marrow transplantation ===
Rare cases of MBL have been reported to develop in individuals who receive a, autologous stem cell bone marrow transplant from donors who have MBL. Currently, the risk of this development is unclear and requires further study. In those special cases where related donors are used for transplantation, it may be useful to screen these donors for MBL.

== Diagnosis ==
=== Blood B-cell counts ===
Individuals with MBL usually present with unexplained increases in blood lymphocyte counts (i.e. lymphocytosis). The most common causes for lymphocytosis are viral infections, autoimmune diseases (particularly connective tissue diseases), hypersensitivity reactions, acute stress reactions, and prior splenectomy. Unlike many individuals with lymphocytosis due to the latter disorders, individuals with MBL are asymptomatic, may have a family history of CLL/SLL, are usually >40 years old, and may have a history of serious infections (high-count MBL is ~3-fold more likely than age-matched healthy controls to have a history of serious infections and infection-related hospitalizations). The diagnosis of MBL in these patients depends on finding 0.5-5 billion monoclonal B cells that express the markers characteristic of CLL/SLL MLB, atypical CLL/SLL MLB, non-CLL/SLL MLB, or MLB-MZ. However, individuals with CBL-MZ commonly present with B-cell blood counts that are extremely high (>4.0 billion; range 3.0 billion/L to 37.1 billion/L); and may have an IgM monoclonal gammopathy.

=== Bone marrow involvement ===
Most individuals with MBL have at presentation an abnormal infiltrate of monoclonal B-cells in their bone marrow as determined by biopsy. These B cells represent a median value of ~20% of all nucleated cells in the marrow. Regardless of the percentage of these cells, the presence of monoclonal B cells in bone marrow does not appear to influence the malignant progression of MBL and is not part of the criteria used to diagnose the disorder.

=== Nodal MBL ===
MBL patients may present with asymptomatic lymphadenopathy (i.e. lymph nodes that are enlarged or abnormal in consistency). In one study, ~42% of MBL patients had enlarged lymph nodes as detected by CT scans. Nonetheless, these patients' rate of progression to malignant disease does not differ from that for MBL patients that had normal CT scans. However, patients who have grossly enlarged (i.e. >1.5 centimeters) (cm) lymph nodes on physical examination do have a greater risk of progression. It has been recommended that patients with ≥1 lymph node larger than 1.5 cm be diagnosed as having Cll/SLL, that patients with lymph nodes ≤1.5 cm in size be diagnoses as having normal MBL, and that CT scans should not be used in diagnosing or staging MBL.

=== MBL with autoimmune cytopenia ===
Rare patients with MBL may present with the autoimmune disease-induced cytopenias of hemolytic anemia (reduced circulating red blood cell numbers) or thrombocytopenic purpura (reduced circulating platelet numbers). In the past, cases of CLL/SLL MBL associated with an autoimmune disease were diagnosed as CLL/SLL. However, patients with these autoimmune disorders who have very small B cell clones either never develop a lymphocyte malignancy or, rarely, do so and only after many years. Consequently, it is now widely recognized that such cases, when associated with very small numbers of monoclonal B-cells, are best diagnosed as CLL/SLL MBL with autoimmune cytopenia rather than CLL/SLL.

=== Tissue-based MBL ===
Monoclonal CLL/SLL phenotype B cells have been found using sensitive flow cytometry methods in various tissues. They have been identified as infiltrates in 1.9% of liver biopsies and 0.4% of prostate tissues obtained at prostatectomy. While the significance of these lesions is unknown, the presence of extensive infiltrations that replace normal tissue is more consistent with a diagnose of CLL/SLL than CLL/SLL MBL.

=== Differential diagnosis ===
The key factor that distinguishes low-count CLL/SLL-MLB, high-count CLL/SLL-MLB, and CLL/SLL is the number of circulating monoclonal B cells, as described above. However, the other MLB phenotypes may progress to and/or be mimicked by various monoclonal B-cell lymphocyte malignancies. The key cell markers and other points that help distinguish the following MBL phenotypes from these malignancies include the following (refer to Table for comparisons to non-malignant predecessor cells):

- Atypical CLL/SLL-MBL
  - Mantle cell lymphoma: The monoclonal B-cells in this aggressive lymphoma are CD5+ in most cases, CD10−, CD23−, CD43+, CD103−, complete Ig+, and express cyclin D1; these cells have translocations between chromosomes 11 and 14 in >95% of cases and in many cases overexpress the SOX11 transcription factor gene. Testing for the chromosome 11, 14 translocation has been recommended for all cases of atypical and non-CLL/SLL MBL.
  - Follicular lymphoma: The monoclonal B-cells in this indolent lymphoma are CD5−, CD10+/−, CD19+, CD20+, CD23+/−, CD103−, CD200− and complete Ig+. These cells often exhibit translocations between chromosomes 14 and 18.
- non-CLL/SLL-ML
  - Splenic marginal zone lymphoma: The monoclonal B-cells in this indolent lymphoma are CD5+/−, CD10−, CD19+, CD23−, CD43−, CD103−, and do not express cyclin D1. These cells may bear deletion in the "q" arm of chromosome 7 (30% of cases), and mutations in NOTCH2 (10-25% of cases), KLF2 (10-40% of cases), and, rarely, MYD88 genes. The monoclonal cells are also CD200− and are complete Ig+. Patients with this lymphoma commonly have an enlarged spleen.
  - Splenic B-cell lymphoma/leukemia unclassifiable: The rare reports on this lymphoma find the monoclonal B cells to be CD19+, CD20+ (bright, CD23+, CD11+, CD25−, CD103−, CD72+, and annexin A1−. These cells, similar to the monoclonal cells in Hairy cell leukemia, may have the V600E mutation in the BRAF gene. Patients with this lymphoma commonly have enlarged spleens.
- MBL-MZ
  - Splenic marginal zone lymphoma and splenic B-cell lymphoma/leukemia: see above descriptions.
  - Waldenström's macroglobulinemia: The monoclonal B-cells in this indolent lymphoma are CD5− (in most cases), CD10−, CD19+, CD23−, CD43−/+, CD103−, cyclin D1+, Cd200−, and globulin + (dim). The cells contain the L265P mutation in the MYD88 (>90% of cases) and a mutation in the CXCR4 gene (30% of cases). Patients with this lymphoma commonly have an IgM gammaopathy, i.e. high blood levels of an IgM monoclonal protein.
  - Hairy cell leukemia: The monoclonal B-cells in this usually indolent CLL/SLL-like leukemia have a distinctive morphology and are CD5−, CD10−, CD19+, CD20+ (bright), CD23−, CD103+, CD200+, and complete Ig+.

==== In situ lymphoid neoplasia ====
In situ lymphoid neoplasia (ISLN), a lymphocyte disorder newly categorized by the World Health Organization (2016,) has several features in common with MBL. Like MBL, it is an asymptomatic, premalignant disorder of B-cells that is associated with the circulation of these cells and may progress to follicular lymphoma, mantle cell lymphoma, or CLL/SLL. ISLN differs from MBL in that its neoplastic B-cells accumulate in the follicles of lymphoid tissue, usually circulate in very low numbers, and bear distinctive genetic abnormalities that differ from those in MBL. ISNL is diagnosed based on, and requiring, the finding of these neoplastic B-cells in lymphoid follicles.

== Treatment ==
Low-count MBL is an indolent disorder that in virtually all individuals does not progress to a malignant phase. Overall survival in low count MBL does not differ from that found in age-matched healthy individuals. MBL-MZ is an exception to this rule: this disorder generally presents with high monoclonal B-cell counts and regardless of the level of these counts may progress to a malignant phase at a greater than that found in other forms of MBL.

Depending on its phenotype (see above Table), high-count MBL progresses to CLL/SLL, mantle cell lymphoma, follicular lymphoma, splenic marginal zone lymphoma, or splenic lymphoma/leukemia unclassifiable at a rate of 1-2% per year whereas MBL-MZ progresses to a marginal zone B-cell lymphoma, Waldenström's macroglobulinemia, or Hairy cell leukemia at a ~3% per year. Factors predisposing to this progression in CLL/SLL MBL include the expression of CD38 cell-surface glycoprotein on the monoclonal B-cells, deletion of the short arm of chromosome 17 in these cells, high serum levels of beta-2 macroglobulin, and circulating B cell levels >10 billion/L. There is relatively little information on the features promoting the progression of atypical CLL/SLL MBL, non-CLL/SLL MBL, and MBL-MZ to their respective lymphomas.

Individuals with high-count MBL (studies based primarily on the CLL/SLL phenotype) are at an increased risk for developing: 1) cancers of the breast, lung, and gastrointestinal tract in up to 13% of all cases; 2) autoimmune hemolytic anemia and immune thrombocytopenic purpura; 3) unexplained kidney disease as manifested by chronic kidney disease and/or the nephrotic syndrome; and 4) serious infections. While earlier studies suggested that only very high-count MBL (i.e. >10 billion B-cells/L) was associated with a decrease in survival, more recent studies indicate that high-count MBL (i.e. (i.e. >0.5 billion B-cells/L) do show a shorter overall survival. In addition to having very high numbers of B-cells, high-count CLL/SLL MLB patients whose monoclonal B cell clone lacks mutations in IGVH genes (see above section on genome abnormalities) or whose |β_{2} macroglobulin is elevated have a shorter survival. However, the shortened survival times in high-count CLL/SLL MBL does not appear due to its progression to CLL/SLL. Rather, this shortened survival appears due to the disorders' susceptibility to serious infections, other types of cancers, immune cytopenias, and renal disease.

Recommended treatments for patients with high-count MBL and MBL-MZ include yearly follow-up evaluations to test for the malignant progression of their disorder and for the development of other forms of cancer, infections, immune cytopenias, and renal disease. It may also be beneficial to ensure that high-count MBL patients are up to date on vaccinations including those for influenza, pneumococcal pneumonia, and tetanus before they become more severely immunocompromised by the progression of their disorder. In all cases live vaccines should be avoided in these individuals.

== See also ==
- In situ lymphoid neoplasia
