= Chronic lymphocytic leukemia =

Bone marrow cancer in which lymphocytes are overproduced

- Other names: B-cell chronic lymphocytic leukemia (B-CLL)
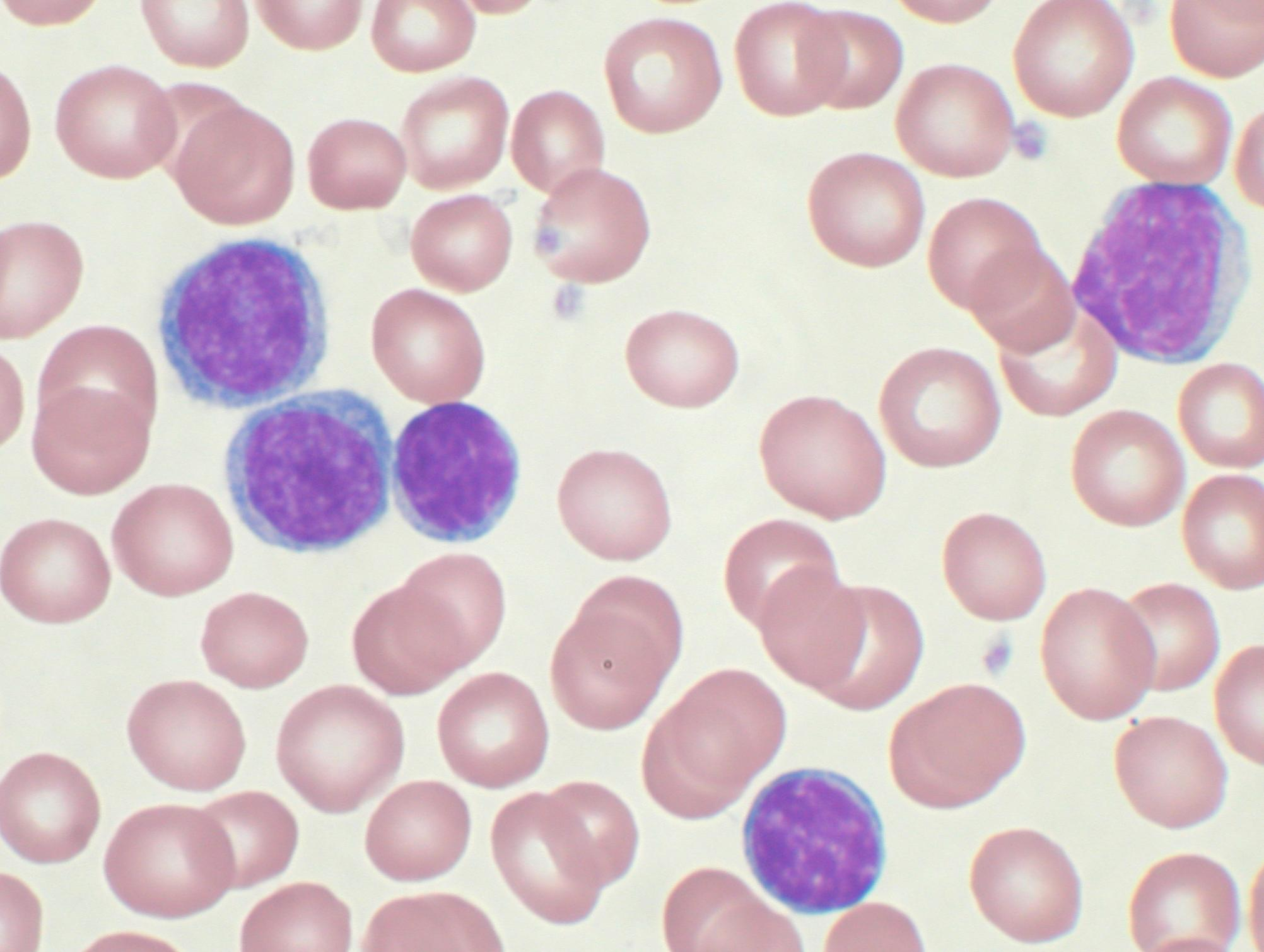
- Peripheral blood smear showing CLL cells
- Specialty: Hematology and oncology
- Symptoms: Early: None; Later: Non-painful lymph nodes swelling, feeling tired, fever, weight loss, night sweats
- Usual onset: Older than 50
- Risk factors: Family history, tobacco use, Agent Orange, certain insecticides
- Diagnostic method: Blood tests
- Differential diagnosis: Mononucleosis, hairy cell leukemia, acute lymphocytic leukemia, persistent polyclonal B-cell lymphocytosis
- Treatment: Watchful waiting, chemotherapy, immunotherapy, targeted therapy, stem cell transplantation
- Prognosis: Five-year survival ~89% (US)
- Frequency: 904,000 (2015)
- Deaths: 60,700 (2015)

Chronic lymphocytic leukemia (CLL) is a type of cancer that affects the blood and bone marrow. In CLL, the bone marrow produces too many lymphocytes, which are a type of white blood cell. B cell lymphocytes can begin to collect in the blood, spleen, lymph nodes, and bone marrow; these cells malfunction and crowd out healthy blood cells. CLL is divided into slow-growing (indolent) and fast-growing variants.

Most individuals have no symptoms when they are first diagnosed with CLL. Around five to 10% of patients may experience fever, fatigue, unexplained weight loss, loss of appetite, painless swelling of the lymph nodes, enlargement of the spleen, and/or anemia. These symptoms often worsen over time. Patients with CLL also have an increased risk of developing serious infections. The exact cause of CLL is unknown, but risk factors include a family history of CLL, tobacco use, or environmental exposure to Agent Orange, ionizing radiation and certain insecticides. Diagnosis is typically by testing the blood for high numbers of mature lymphocytes and "smudge cells".

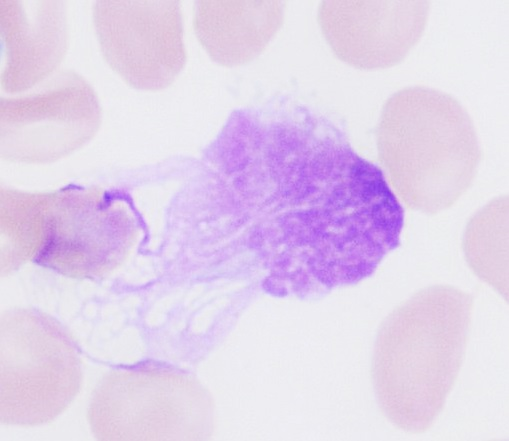
A typical "smudge cell" on a peripheral blood smear, a common finding in patients with chronic lymphocytic leukemia (CLL).

Asymptomatic patients of CLL are often managed by watchful waiting and monitoring for infections. There is currently no evidence that early intervention can alter the course of the disease. Those with significant symptoms are treated with chemotherapy, immunotherapy, or a combination of both, depending on the individual's age, physical condition, and whether they have the del(17p) or TP53 mutations.

CLL is the most common type of leukemia in the Western world. It most commonly affects individuals over the age of 65 due to the accumulation of genetic mutations that occur over time. CLL is rarely seen in individuals younger than 40 years old. Men are more commonly affected than women, although the average lifetime risk for both genders is similar (around 0.5–1%). It represented less than 1% of deaths from cancer between 1980 and 2015.

== Signs and symptoms ==
Most people are diagnosed as having CLL based on the result of a routine blood test that shows a high white blood cell count, specifically a large increase in the number of circulating lymphocytes. Most commonly, patients have no symptoms at first. In a small number of cases, patients with CLL may present with enlarged lymph nodes, partially in areas around the neck, armpit, or groin. In rare circumstances, the disease is recognized only after the cancerous cells overwhelm the bone marrow, resulting in low red blood cells, neutrophils, or platelets. This can then result in symptoms such as fever, easy bleeding/bruising, night sweats, weight loss, and increased tiredness. In some instances, the cancerous cells can accumulate in the spleen and result in an enlarged spleen.

=== Complications ===
About 25% of patients with CLL have very low levels of antibodies in their bloodstream (hypogammaglobulinemia) at diagnosis, with several more patients developing this throughout the course of their disease. This decrease in antibodies increases the patient's risk of recurrent infections and other autoimmune complications, such as autoimmune hemolytic anemia and immune thrombocytopenia. Autoimmune hemolytic anemia occurs in about 5-10% of CLL patients, which is when one's own immune system attacks its own red blood cells.

A more serious complication called Richter's transformation (RT) occurs in 2–10% of patients with CLL. This is a process in which the original CLL cells convert to a far more aggressive disease that has the biology and histopathology of diffuse large B cell lymphoma or less commonly Hodgkin's lymphoma. These patients typically present with a sudden clinical deterioration that can be characterized by unexplained fevers or weight loss, asymmetric and rapid growth of lymph nodes, and/or a significant drop in the number of white blood cells, red blood cells, or platelets. Treatment for RT typically consists of various chemotherapy/chemo-immunotherapy protocols.

CLL has also been reported to convert into other more aggressive diseases such as lymphoblastic lymphoma, hairy cell leukemia, high grade T cell lymphomas, acute myeloid leukemia, lung cancer, brain cancer, melanoma of the eye or skin, salivary gland tumors, and Kaposi's sarcomas. While some of these conversions have been termed RTs, the World Health Organization and most reviews have defined RT as a conversion of CLL/SLL into a disease with DLBCL or HL histopathology.

Gastrointestinal (GI) involvement can also rarely occur with chronic lymphocytic leukemia. Some of the reported manifestations include intussusception, small intestinal bacterial contamination, colitis, and bleeding. Usually, GI complications with CLL occur after Richter transformation. Two cases to date have been reported of GI involvement in chronic lymphocytic leukemia without Richter's transformation.

== Causes ==
The exact cause of CLL is unknown. However, family history has been strongly correlated with disease development. Environmental factors may also play a role in the development of CLL. For instance, exposure to Agent Orange increases the risk of CLL, and exposure to hepatitis C virus may increase the risk. There is no clear association between ionizing radiation exposure and the risk of developing CLL. Blood transfusions have been ruled out as a risk factor.

== Mechanism ==
A diagram showing the cells affected by CLL

CLL results from an unusual growth and expansion of white blood cells. This manifestation typically begins with a single hematopoietic stem cell that acquires certain mutations over time that allows it to continue to expand and grow at a faster rate than other cells. Each patient with CLL may be affected by a different set of mutations, making these cells sometimes difficult to target and treat. Some of the most common mutations that have been found in CLL-affected cells include the following: NOTCH1, TP53, ATM, and SF3B1.

CLL can also be caused by several epigenetic changes, which are adaptations that add a tag to specific DNA sequences, rather than altering the sequence itself. In CLL, these changes can be classified into the addition of three different methyl subgroups (naïve B-cell-like, memory B-cell-like, and intermediate), which impact how much that DNA sequence is transcribed. Some relevant genetic mutations may be inherited. Since no single mutation is associated with CLL in all cases, an individual's susceptibility may be impacted when multiple mutations that are associated with an increased risk of CLL are co-inherited. Up until 2020, 45 susceptibility loci have been identified. Of these loci, 93% are linked to the alteration of 30 gene expressions involved in immune response, cell survival, or Wnt signaling.

As CLL cells accumulate, they promote inflammation and an immunosuppressive environment by releasing chemical signals.

CLL is commonly preceded by a pre-cancerous state known as monoclonal B-cell lymphocytosis (MBL). This occurs when there is an increase in a specific type of white blood cells, but the number remains less than 5 billion cells per liter (L) (5 billion/L) of blood. This subtype, termed chronic lymphocytic leukemia-type MBL (CLL-type MBL), is an asymptomatic, indolent, and chronic disorder in which people exhibit a mild increase in the number of circulating B-cell lymphocytes. These B-cells are monoclonal, which means a single ancestral B-cell produced them. They share some of the same cell marker proteins, chromosome abnormalities, and gene mutations that are found in CLL.

CLL-type MBL can be separated into two groups:

1. Low-count MBL has monoclonal B-cell blood counts of <0.5 billion cells/liter (i.e. 0.5 billion/L)
2. High-count MBL has blood monoclonal B-cell counts ≥0.5 billion/L but <5 billion/L.

Low-count MBL rarely if ever progresses to CLL, while high-count CLL/SLL MBL does so at a rate of around 1% per year. Thus, CLL may present in individuals with a long history of having high-count MBL. There is no established treatment for these individuals except monitoring for development of the disorder's various complications (see treatment of MBL complications) and for their progression to CLL.

== Diagnosis ==
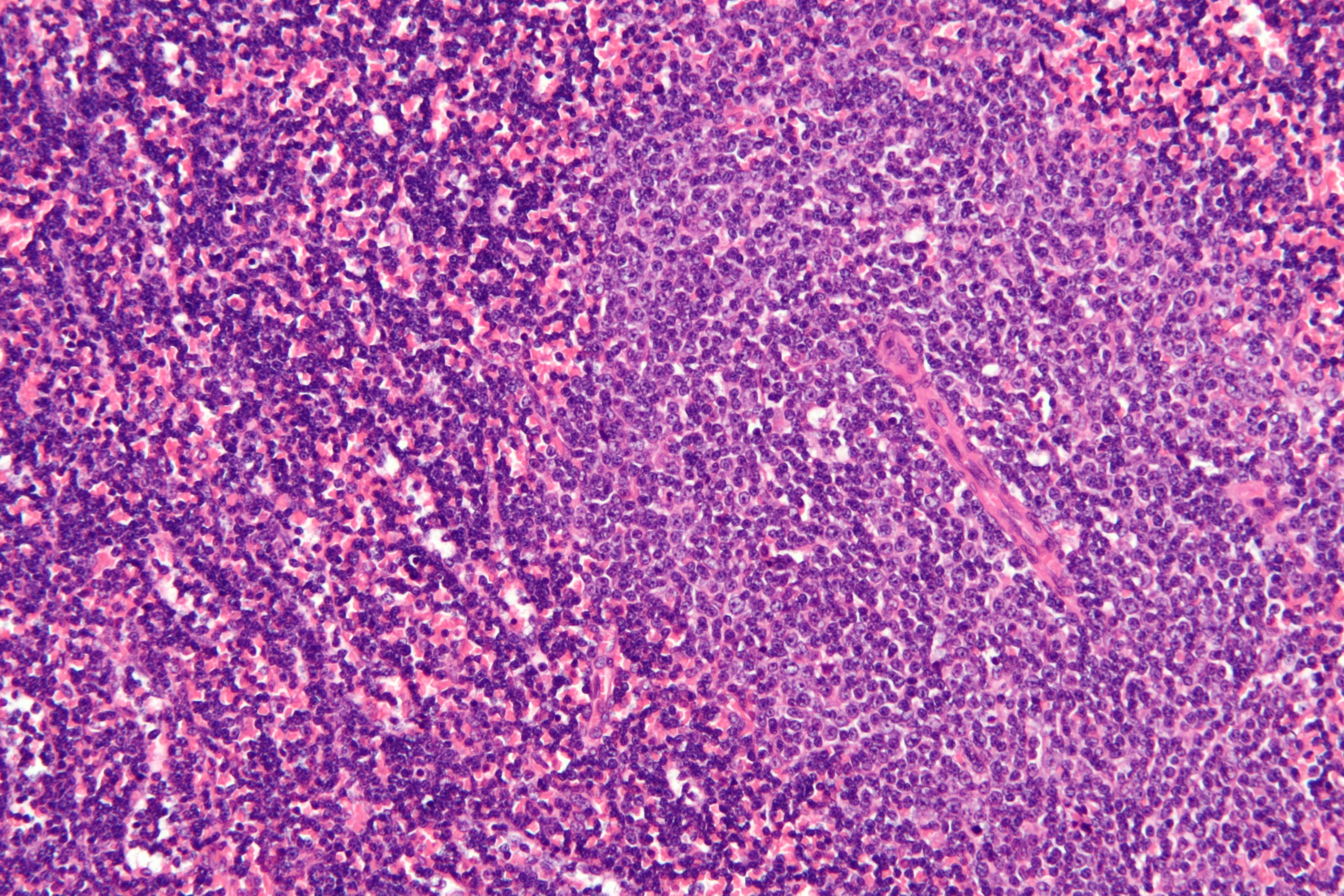
Micrograph of a lymph node affected by B-CLL showing a characteristic proliferation center (right of image), composed of larger, lighter-staining cells, H&E stain

The diagnosis of CLL is based on the demonstration of an abnormal population of B lymphocytes in the blood, bone marrow, or tissues that display an unusual but characteristic pattern of cell-surface molecules. CLL is usually first suspected by a diagnosis of lymphocytosis, an increase in a type of white blood cell, on a complete blood count test. This is frequently an incidental finding on a routine physician visit. Most often, the lymphocyte count is greater than 5000 cells per microliter (μL) of blood, but it can be much higher. The presence of lymphocytosis in a person who is elderly should raise a strong suspicion for CLL, and a confirmatory diagnostic test, in particular flow cytometry, should be performed unless clinically unnecessary.

=== Classification ===
To be diagnosed with CLL, the patient must have a white blood cell count greater than 5 billion cells per liter (L) (5 billion/L) of blood. If CLL-type cells are mainly found in the lymph nodes or lymphoid tissue (such as the spleen), a diagnosis of small lymphocytic lymphoma (SLL) is made. When these cancerous cells appear mostly in the blood, the disease is classified as CLL.

=== Clinical staging ===
Staging, which helps determine the extent of the disease, is done using one of two systems: the Rai staging system (most commonly used in the United States) or the Binet classification(most commonly used in Europe). These systems are simple, requiring the use of only physical examination and blood test results.

==== Rai staging system ====
- Low-risk disease (formerly Stage 0): characterized by lymphocytosis with cancer cells in the blood and/or bone marrow without lymphadenopathy, enlargement of the liver and spleen, anemia, or thrombocytopenia
- Intermediate-risk disease (formerly Stage I/II): characterized by lymphocytosis, swollen lymph nodes (may be palpable or not), spleen enlargement, and/or liver enlargement
- High-risk disease (formerly Stage III/IV): characterized by lymphocytosis with associated anemia (hemoglobin <11 g/dL) OR thrombocytopenia (<100,000/mm^{3}) with or without lymphadenopathy, hepatomegaly (liver enlargement), splenomegaly (spleen enlargement), or anemia.

==== Binet classification ====
This classification system is based on the number of body areas affected and the presence of anemia or thrombocytopenia. Areas of involvement include the (1) head and neck (considered one), (2) one or both of the armpits, (3) the groin, (4) the spleen, and (5) the liver. They are considered affected if a lymph node greater than 1 cm in diameter is present and/or the spleen or liver is palpable.

- Clinical stage A: characterized by no anemia (Hb > 10 g/dL) or thrombocytopenia (platelets > 100 billion/L) and no greater than two areas of lymphoid involvement (described above)
- Clinical stage B: characterized by no anemia (Hb > 10 g/dL) or thrombocytopenia (platelets > 100 billion/L) with three or more areas of lymphoid involvement
- Clinical stage C: characterized by anemia (Hb < 10 g/dL) and/or thrombocytopenia (platelets < 100 billion/L) regardless of the number of areas of lymph node or organ enlargement

==== Array-based karyotyping ====
Array-based karyotyping is a cost-effective alternative to FISH for detecting chromosomal abnormalities in CLL. Several clinical validation studies have shown >95% concordance with the standard CLL FISH panel.

=== Molecular examination of peripheral blood and flow cytometry ===
The combination of the microscopic examination of the peripheral blood and analysis of the lymphocytes by flow cytometry to confirm clonality and molecular expression is needed to establish the diagnosis of CLL. Both are easily accomplished with a small sample of blood.

A flow cytometer instrument can examine the expression of molecules on individual cells. This requires the use of specific antibodies to cell-surface molecules that have fluorescent tags that are recognized by the instrument. In CLL, the lymphocytes are all genetically identical since they are derived from the same B cell lineage. CLL cells can express the typical B-cell markers such as CD19 and CD20, as well as abnormal surface markers such as CD5 and CD23.

On a peripheral blood smear, CLL cells resemble normal lymphocytes, but are slightly smaller. They are also very fragile and susceptible to breaking when smeared onto a glass slide, giving rise to "smudge" or "smear" cells, which are a hallmark of the disease. Smudge cells are a result of CLL cells lacking vimentin, a type of cytoskeleton proteins which is a structural component in a cell which maintains the cell's internal shape and mechanical resilience).

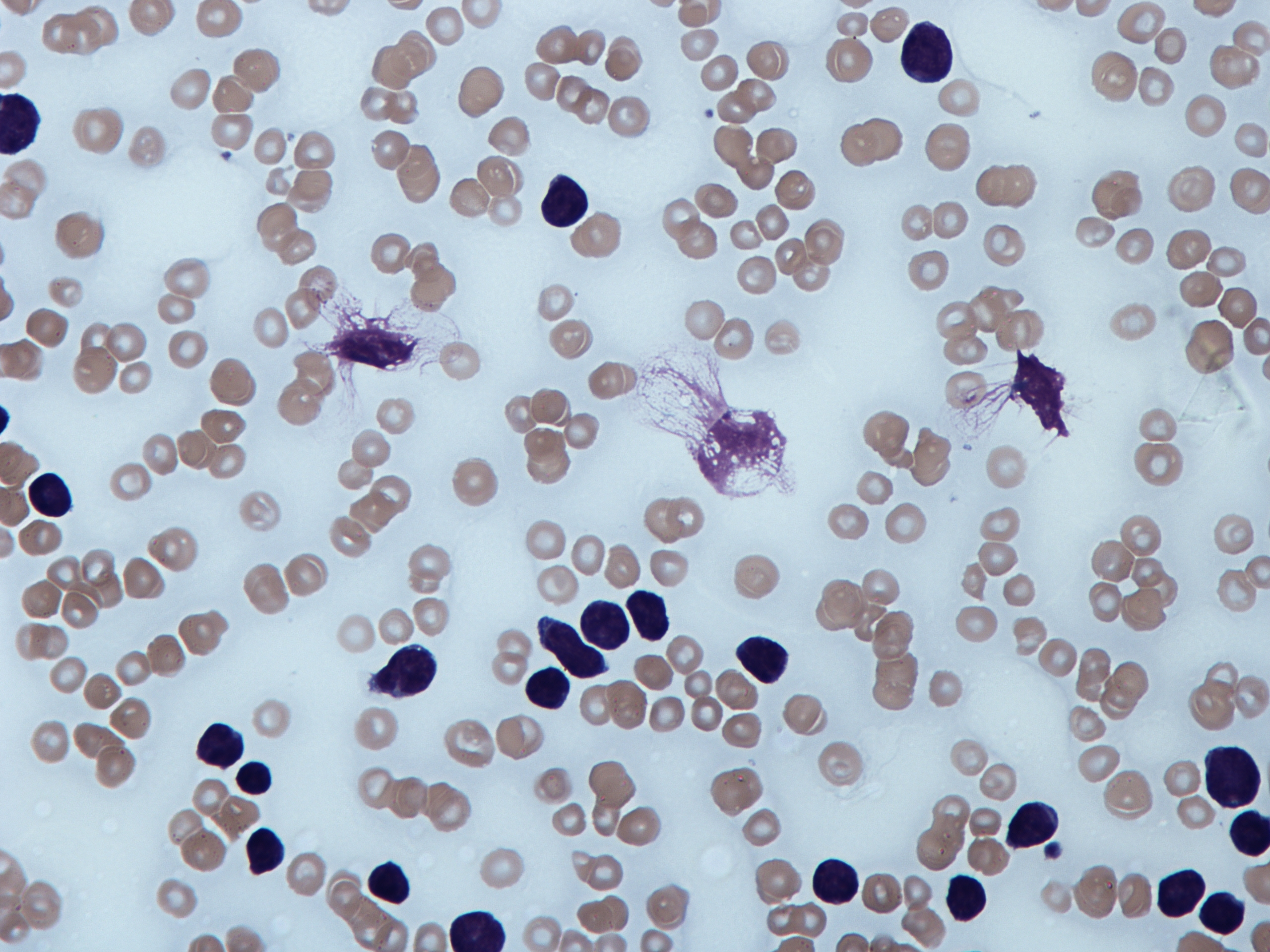
Smudge cells in peripheral blood

=== Surface markers ===
The atypical molecular pattern on the surface of the cell includes the co-expression of cell surface markers clusters of differentiation 5 (CD5) and 23. In addition, all the CLL cells within one individual are clonal, that is, genetically identical. In practice, this is inferred by the detection of only one of the mutually exclusive antibody light chains, kappa or lambda, on the entire population of the abnormal B cells. Normal B lymphocytes consist of a stew of different antibody-producing cells, resulting in a mixture of both kappa- and lambda-expressing cells. The lack of the normal distribution of these B cells is one basis for demonstrating clonality, the key element for establishing a diagnosis of any B cell malignancy (B cell non-Hodgkin lymphoma). The Matutes's CLL score allows the identification of a homogeneous subgroup of classical CLL, that differs from atypical/mixed CLL for the five markers' expression (CD5, CD23, FMC7, CD22, and immunoglobulin light chain) Matutes's CLL scoring system is very helpful for the differential diagnosis between classical CLL and the other B cell chronic lymphoproliferative disorders, but not for the immunological distinction between mixed/atypical CLL and mantle cell lymphoma (MCL malignant B cells). Discrimination between CLL and MCL can be improved by adding non-routine markers such as CD54 and CD200. Among routine markers, the most discriminating feature is the CD20/CD23 mean fluorescence intensity ratio. FMC7 expression can be misleading for borderline cases.

=== Related diseases ===
In the past, cases with a similar microscopic appearance in the blood but with a T-cell phenotype were referred to as T-cell CLL. However, these are now recognized as a separate disease group and are currently classified as T-cell prolymphocytic leukemias (T-PLL). An accurate diagnosis of T-PLL is important as it is a rare and aggressive disease.

CLL should not be confused with acute lymphoblastic leukemia, a highly aggressive leukemia most commonly diagnosed in children, and highly treatable in the pediatric setting.

=== Differential diagnosis ===
Lymphoid disorders that can present as chronic leukemia and can be confused with typical B-cell chronic lymphoid leukemia
Follicular lymphoma
Splenic marginal zone lymphoma
Nodal marginal zone B cell lymphoma
Mantle cell lymphoma
Hairy cell leukemia
Prolymphocytic leukemia (B cell or T cell)
Lymphoplasmacytic lymphoma
Sézary syndrome
Smoldering adult T cell leukemia/lymphoma

Hematologic disorders that may resemble CLL in their clinical presentation, behavior, and microscopic appearance include mantle cell lymphoma, marginal zone lymphoma, B-cell prolymphocytic leukemia, and lymphoplasmacytic lymphoma.

- B cell prolymphocytic leukemia, a related, but more aggressive disorder, has cells with a similar phenotype, but are significantly larger than normal lymphocytes and have a prominent nucleolus. The distinction is important as the prognosis and therapy differ from CLL.
- Hairy cell leukemia is also a neoplasm of B lymphocytes, but the neoplastic cells have a distinct morphology under the microscope (hairy cell leukemia cells have delicate, hair-like projections on their surfaces) and unique marker molecule expression.

All the B-cell malignancies of the blood and bone marrow can be differentiated from one another by the combination of cellular microscopic morphology, marker molecule expression, and specific tumor-associated gene defects. This is best accomplished by evaluation of the patient's blood, bone marrow, and occasionally lymph node cells by a pathologist with specific training in blood disorders. A flow cytometer is necessary for cell marker analysis, and the detection of genetic problems in the cells may require visualizing the DNA changes with fluorescent probes by FISH.

== Treatment ==
CLL treatment focuses on controlling and limiting the progression of the disease and its symptoms, as it remains incurable as of 2017. In patients with few to no symptoms, watchful waiting with close observation is generally appropriate.

Treatment is recommended when patients become symptomatic or experience one of the following:

- Dangerous drops in their red blood cell or platelet count
- A doubling of their white blood cells in 6 months or less
- Significant splenomegaly
- Severe swelling of the lymph nodes, and/or
- Richter transformation

As of 2024, first-line treatment for CLL involves the use of targeted biological therapy. Other treatment options include: chemotherapy, radiation therapy, bone marrow transplantation, and supportive or palliative care.

Radiation therapy is usually only done in patients with SLL who have symptomatic localized disease, such as bulky lymph nodes. In special circumstances, patients can develop massive splenomegaly that may lead to the destruction of red blood cells, white blood cells, and platelets. In these cases, the patient may be treated with steroids or IVIG; however, if the patient does not respond to these treatments, they may have to undergo a splenectomy, removal of the spleen.

CLL treatment regimens vary depending on the patient's age, physical health, and disease progression. Several agents may be used for the treatment of CLL.

Treatment approaches for SLL and CLL are usually the same.

=== Decision to treat ===
While it is generally considered incurable, CLL progresses slowly in most cases. Many people with CLL lead normal and active lives for many years—in some cases for decades. Because of its slow onset, asymptomatic early-stage CLL (Rai 0, Binet A) is, in general, not treated since it is believed that early-stage CLL intervention does not improve survival time or quality of life. Instead, the condition is monitored over time to detect any change in the disease pattern.

There are two widely used staging systems in CLL to determine when and how to treat the patient: The Rai staging system, used in the United States, and the Binet system in Europe. Both these systems attempt to characterize the disease based on the bulk and marrow failure. A "watchful waiting" strategy is used for most patients with CLL. The International Workshop on CLL (iwCLL) has issued guidelines with specific markers that should be met to initiate treatment, generally based on evidence for progressive symptomatic disease (summarized as "active disease").

=== Targeted biological therapy ===
Targeted therapy attacks cancer cells at a specific target, with the aim of not harming normal cells. In patients with CLL, B-cell receptor (BCR) signaling appears to play a vital role in the growth and survival of CLL cells. BCR signaling is supported by several different tyrosine kinase inhibitors (such as BTK, PI3K, etc.), which can all be targeted to help interfere with the growth of these CLL cells. Another mechanism that CLL cells use to avoid destruction involves the use of proteins in the B-cell lymphoma (Bcl-2) family. By blocking the function of those Bcl-2 proteins, targeted drugs can prevent further progression of CLL-related tumors.

Some of the most common biological drugs used to treat CLL include:

- Bruton tyrosine kinase inhibitors (including ibrutinib, acalabrutinib, and zanubrutinib)
- BCL-2 inhibitors (including venetoclax), and
- Phosphatidylinositol 3-kinase inhibitors (including idelalisib and duvelisib).

=== Monoclonal antibodies ===
==== Anti-CD20 antibodies ====
CD20 is a protein that is found on the surface of B-cells and thus serves as an important target in the treatment of many B-cell malignancies, including CLL. Some CD20 antibodies that have been used for the treatment of CLL include:

- Rituximab
- Ofatumumab
- Obinutuzumab

These agents are usually used in refractory/relapsed disease or in combination with other agents, like chlorambucil (CLB), fludarabine, or venetoclax.

==== Other monoclonal antibodies ====
- Alemtuzumab targets the CD52 receptor, which is usually found on the surface of many immune cells. This agent is also primarily used in refractory disease.

=== Chemotherapy ===
Monotherapy using alkylating agents (i.e., chlorambucil and bendamustine) served as a front-line therapy for CLL for many years. In fact, chlorambucil (CLB) was the "gold standard" treatment for CLL for several decades. However, researchers found that it was not very effective at helping patients achieve remission; thus, it may not be used as frequently in practice anymore.

Combination chemotherapy regimens can be effective in both newly diagnosed and relapsed CLL. Combinations of fludarabine with alkylating agents (cyclophosphamide) produce higher response rates and longer progression-free survival than single agents:

- FC (fludarabine with cyclophosphamide)
- FR (fludarabine with rituximab)
- FCR (fludarabine, cyclophosphamide, and rituximab)

Although the purine analogue fludarabine was shown to give superior response rates to chlorambucil (CLB) as primary therapy, the early use of fludarabine has not been shown to improve overall survival, and some clinicians prefer to reserve fludarabine for relapsed disease.

Chemoimmunotherapy with FCR has been shown to improve response rates, progression-free survival, and overall survival in a large randomized trial in CLL patients selected for good physical fitness.

=== Stem cell transplantation ===
Autologous stem cell transplantation, using the recipient's own cells, is not curative. Younger individuals, if at high risk for dying from CLL, may consider allogeneic hematopoietic stem cell transplantation (HSCT). Myeloablative (bone marrow killing) forms of allogeneic stem cell transplantation, a high-risk treatment using blood cells from a healthy donor, may be curative, but treatment-related toxicity is significant. An intermediate level, called reduced-intensity conditioning allogeneic stem cell transplantation, may be better tolerated by older or frail patients.

=== Refractory CLL ===
"Refractory" CLL is a disease that no longer responds favorably to treatment within six months following the last cancer therapy. In this case, more aggressive targeted therapies, such as BCR or BCL2 pathway inhibitors, have been associated with increased survival.

== Prognosis ==
Prognosis can be affected by the type of genetic mutation that the person with CLL has. Some examples of genetic mutations and their prognoses are: mutations in the IGHV region are associated with a median overall survival (OS) of more than 20–25 years, while no mutations in this region is associated with a median OS of 8–10 years; deletion of chromosome 13q is associated with a median OS of 17 years; and trisomy of chromosome 12, as well as deletion of chromosome 11q, is associated with a median OS of 9–11 years. While prognosis is highly variable and dependent on various factors, including these mutations, the average 5-year relative survival is 89.3% in the US as of 2021. Telomere length has been suggested to be a valuable prognostic indicator of survival. In addition, a person's sex has been found to have an impact on CLL prognosis and treatment efficacy. More specifically, females have been found to survive longer (without disease progression) than males, when treated with certain medications.

As of 2022, the most commonly used prognostic score is the CLL International Prognostic Index (CLL-IPI). This system takes into account the following factors:

1. TP53 gene deletion and/or mutation
2. Mutated immunoglobulin heavy chain variable (IGHV)
3. Serum B_{2}-microglobulin levels
4. Clinical stage (see the Rai and Binet staging systems above)
5. Age

== Epidemiology ==
CLL is the most common type of leukemia in the Western world compared to non-Western regions such as Asia, Latin America, and Africa. It is observed globally that males are twice as likely than females to acquire CLL. CLL is primarily a disease of older adults, with 9 out of 10 cases occurring after the age of 50 years. The median age of diagnosis is 70 years. In young people, new cases of CLL are twice as likely to be diagnosed in men than in women. In older people, however, this difference becomes less pronounced: after the age of 80 years, new cases of CLL are diagnosed equally between men and women.

According to the American Cancer Society, they estimate that there will be about 23,690 new cases of CLL, with about 4,460 deaths from CLL in the United States throughout 2025. Five-year survival following diagnosis is approximately 89% in the United States as of 2021. It represents less than 1% of deaths from cancer.

Because of the prolonged survival, which was typically about 10 years in past decades, but which can extend to a normal life expectancy, the prevalence (number of people living with the disease) is much higher than the incidence (new diagnoses). CLL is the most common type of leukemia in the UK, accounting for 38% of all leukemia cases. Approximately 3,200 people were diagnosed with the disease in 2011.

In Western populations, subclinical "disease" can be identified in 3.5% of normal adults, and in up to 8% of individuals over the age of 70. That is, small clones of B cells with the characteristic CLL phenotype can be identified in many healthy elderly persons. The clinical significance of these cells is unknown.

CLL seems to be rarer in Asian countries, such as Japan, China, and Korea, accounting for less than 10% of all leukemias in those regions. A low incidence is seen in Japanese immigrants to the US, and in African and Asian immigrants to Israel.

Of all cancers involving the same class of blood cell, 7% of cases were CLL/SLL as of 2001.

People who live near areas with considerable industrial pollution have an elevated risk of developing leukemia, particularly CLL.

== Research directions ==
In light of newer targeted therapies such as Bruton tyrosine kinase inhibitors and anti-CD20 monoclonal antibodies, the need for bone marrow transplants in patients with CLL has become rare. Bone marrow transplants are only recommended in specific cases when front-line therapies have either failed and/or the patient continues to relapse.

There have been major advances in the treatment of patients with CLL over the past 10 years or so. Although this disease remains incurable, therapies such as Bruton tyrosine kinase inhibitors (including ibrutinib, acalabrutinib, and zanubrutinib), BCL-2 inhibitors (including venetoclax), and phosphatidylinositol 3-kinase inhibitors (including idelalisib and duvelisib) allow patients with CLL to now live longer.

Despite the great success of these new targeted biological therapies so far, more research is needed in order to establish clearer guidelines on the optimal combination and sequence of these agents based on the patient's specific clinical presentation. Furthermore, for patients who do not respond to these agents, treatment options are limited. Thus, further research should be focused on discovering therapies that target other important chemical pathways.

== Special Populations ==
=== Pregnancy ===
Leukemia is rarely associated with pregnancy, affecting only about one in 10,000 pregnant women. Treatment for chronic lymphocytic leukemias can often be postponed until after the end of the pregnancy. If treatment is necessary, then giving chemotherapy during the second or third trimesters is less likely to result in pregnancy loss or birth defects than treatment during the first trimester.

== See also ==
- B-cell CLL/lymphoma
