= In situ lymphoid neoplasia =

- Specialty: Hematology, oncology
- Symptoms: Asymptomatic
- Complications: May progress to follicular lymphoma or mantle cell lymphoma; may be associated with the development of certain other lymphoid malignancies
- Duration: Chronic
- Types: In situ follicular lymphoma; in situ mantle cell lymphoma
- Treatment: Follow-up tests for the development of follicular or mantle cell lymphoma, or other lymphoid malignancies

In situ lymphoid neoplasia (ISLN, also termed in situ lymphoma) is a precancerous condition newly classified by the World Health Organization in 2016. The Organization recognized two subtypes of ISLN: in situ follicular neoplasia (ISFN) and in situ mantle cell neoplasia (ISMCL). ISFN and ISMCL are pathological accumulations of lymphocytes in the germinal centers and mantle zones, respectively, of the follicles that populate lymphoid organs such as lymph nodes. These lymphocytes are monoclonal (i.e. descendants of a single ancestral cell) B-cells that may develop into follicular (FL) and mantle cell (MCL) lymphomas, respectively.

When used to characterize a neoplasm, in situ has referred to a localized, non-destructive accumulation in a tissue of cells that bear resemblances to the malignant cells of one of the cancers that can develop in this tissue. The in situ accumulations can progress to become the malignancy that their cells resemble. The term, while readily applicable to abnormal cell accumulations in solid tissues such as those of the cervix, has been difficult to apply to lymphatic tissue because many of these tissue's cells normally move through blood and lymphatic vessels to occupy other tissues. Recently, however, monoclonal B-cells with some key characteristics of the malignant B-cells in FL or MCL have been found to accumulate in one or more lymphoid tissues. These accumulations are localized, non-destructive (i.e. not effacing a tissue's normal architecture), premalignant, and therefore now regarded as in situ disorders similar to those in solid tissues.

ISFN and ISMCL are usually indolent, asymptomatic disorders that rarely progress to malignancy. Typically, they are diagnosed based on the findings in lymphoid tissues examined for other reasons. ISLN bear similarities to monoclonal B-cell lymphocytosis (MBL). MLB consists of four subtypes: chronic lymphocytic leukemia/small lymphocyte MBL (i.e. CLL/SLL-MBL), atypical CLL/SLL-MBL, non-CLL/SLL-MBL, and monoclonal B-cell lymphocytosis of the marginal zone (CBL-MZ). These MBL subtypes are indolent, asymptomatic, monoclonal B-cell disorders diagnosed, generally incidentally, by finding the circulation of relatively large numbers of monoclonal B-cells that correspond in type to the malignancies to which they may progress. ISLN differs from MCL in that its B-cells are found mainly in lymphoid tissue, it involves different monoclonal B-cell types, and it usually progresses to a set of different types of lymphoid malignancies. However, 1) MBL disorders can progress to FL or MCL, 2) small numbers of the B-cells involved in ISFN may circulate in individuals who have or will develop ISFN, and 3) the B-cells in MBL may accumulate in lymphoid tissues.

== Presentation ==
ISFL and ISMCL are generally asymptomatic disorders discovered in lymphoid tissues which were examined for other reasons. Typically, a follicle(s) in a superficial lymph node(s) is the site of these disorders. However, the follicles in deep lymph nodes the abdomen or of the tonsils, intestines, spleen, parotid gland, or thyroid may harbor the disorder in ISFL whereas a follicle(s) in the small intestine, appendix, ocular adnexa, nasopharynx, oropharynx, or spleen may harboring the disorder in ISMCL. The prevalence of these disorders in unselected lymph node specimens are reported to be ~2.8% and 0.35%, respectively. Multiple tissues can be involved in some cases. Both disorders occur predominantly in middle-aged and older individuals with ISFL being twice as common in males than females.

== Pathophysiology ==
=== In situ follicular lymphoma ===
In situ follicular lymphoma has also been termed follicular lymphoma in situ; follicular lymphoma of B cells of undetermined significance; intrafollicular neoplasia/in situ follicular lymphoma; in situ localization of follicular lymphoma; incipient follicular lymphoma; and follicular lymphoma of compartmentalized follicular central cells. The disorder involves an accumulation of monoclonal B-cells in the germinal centers of lymphoid tissue. These B-cells commonly bear a translocation between position 32 on the long (i.e. "q") arm of chromosome 14 and position 21 on chromosome 18's q arm. This same t(14:18)(q32:q21) translocation is a genetic hallmark of FL and juxtaposes the B-cell lymphoma 2 (BCL2) gene on chromosome 18 at position q21.33 with the immunoglobulin heavy chain locus (IGH@) on chromosome 14 at position q21. In consequence, BCL2 overexpresses its product, BCL2 apoptosis regulator (i.e. Bcl2). Blc2 functions to inhibit programmed cell death thereby prolonging cell survival. The overexpression of Bcl2 in the B-cells of ISFL is thought to be a critical factor in their pathological accumulation and subsequent malignant progression.

Small numbers (e.g. 1 in 100,000) of circulating blood cells bearing the t(14:18)(q32:q21) translocation are found in 50-67% of otherwise healthy individuals. The prevalence of this finding increases with age, tobacco smoking, pesticide exposure, and race (50-70% in Caucasians, 10-20% in Japanese individuals). Since most individuals with this translocation in their blood cells do not develop ISFL or FL, t(14:18)(q32:q21), while prolonging cell survival, must be just one step in the development of these disorders. The translocation is proposed to occur during the early development of immature bone marrow B-cells (i.e. pre-B-cells/pro-B-cells) after which these cells circulate freely and in rare cases accumulate in the germinal centers of lymphoid follicles to form ISFL. The mechanism(s) favoring this localization and accumulation is unclear. Up to 6% of the individuals with ISFL progress to FL. This progression may involve the acquisition of other genomic aberrations in the ISFL B-cells such as mutations in the following genes: 1) EZH2 (encodes polycomb repressive complex 2 family protein which is involved in maintaining the transcriptional repressive state of various genes and is found in up to 27% of FL cases); 2) CREBBP (encodes CREB-binding protein which contributes to the activation of various genes); 3) TNFSF14 (encodes tumor necrosis factor superfamily member 14, a member of the tumor necrosis factor superfamily which may function as a co-stimulatory factor for the activation of lymphoid cells); and 4) KMT2D (encodes histone-lysine N-methyltransferase 2D, a histone methyltransferase which regulates the expression of various genes). ISFL may also acquire numerous copy-number variations (i.e. duplications and deletions of a portion of a chromosome along with any of the genes contained therein) that may contribute to FL. In all cases, the number of genetic abnormalities acquired in the B-cells of ISFL are much less than those in FL.

=== In situ mantle cell neoplasia ===
In situ mantle cell neoplasia has also been termed in situ involvement by MCL-like cells and in situ-like B-cells of uncertain significance. The disorder involves the accumulation of monoclonal B-cells in the inner layer of the mantel zone of lymphoid follicles. In most cases of ISFL, these B-cells bear a translocation between position 13 on the q arm of chromosome 11 and position 32 on chromosome 14's q arm. This t(11:14)q13:q32) translocation, which is a hallmark found in most cases of MCL, juxtaposes the CCND1 gene at position 13.3 on the q arm of chromosome 11 with the IGH@ locus on chromosome 14 at position q21. In consequence, CCND1 overexpresses cyclin D1, a protein which promotes the cell cycle and thereby cellular proliferation. The overexpression of cyclin D1 is thought to be a major factor in the development of ISMCL and its progression to MCL.

Extremely low numbers of circulating blood cells that bear the t(11:14)(q13:q32) translocation occur in 1-8% of healthy individuals. While the role of these cells in causing ISMCL has not been clarified, it is suggested that, similar to the events in the development of ISFL, this translocation occurs in bone marrow pre-B-cells/pro-B-cells after which the cells circulate freely and in rare cases accumulate in the mantle zone of lymphoid follicles to form ISMCL and thereafter MCl. Development of ISMCL and MCL from bone marrow and circulating B-cells bearing the t(14:18)q32:q21) transformation is much less common than the development of ISFL from bone marrow and circulation ISFL cells bearing the t(11:14)q13:q32) translocation, perhaps because the overexpression of cyclin D2 is weaker than Bcl2 overexpression in driving cells to accumulate and become malignant. The progression of ISMCL to MCL appears to involve the acquisition of other genetic alterations in ISMCL B-cells. Deletions and mutations of TP53 (located on the short (i.e. "p") arm of chromosome 17 at position p13.1 (i.e. at 17p13.1 and encoding a tumor suppressor protein); CDKN2Aand CDKN2A (both located at 9p21.3 and respectively encoding cyclin dependent kinase inhibitor 2A and cyclin dependent kinase inhibitor 2B which regulate the cell cycle); RB1 (located at 13q14.2 and encoding the tumor suppressor and cell cycle regulator, retinoblastoma 1); and ATM (located at 11q22.3 and encoding ATM serine/threonine kinase, a kinase that regulates the activity of various tumor suppressors and cell cycle proteins). It may also involve gains in the expression of MYC and BMI1 (encoding the c-Myc and B lymphoma Mo-MLV insertion region 1 homolog proto-oncogenes). However, the roles of these gene products is uncertain because there are scores of other genetic abnormalities in MCL that could contribute to the progression of ISMCL to MCL.

== Diagnosis ==
=== ISFL ===
The diagnosis of ISFL requires that sensitive immunochemistry methods find that germinal centers but not other sites of involved lymph follicles contain monotonous-appearing or sometimes atypical lymphocytes that strongly express Bcl2 due to a t(14:18)(q32:q21) translocation. Usually, these cells also strongly express CD10 moderately express CD20 and Bcl6, and proliferate slowly as defined by their Ki-67 levels. The follicles often have a reactive, hyperplastic appearance but the follicular mantle as well as the surrounding lymphoid tissue retain an overall normal architecture. ISFL is associated with overt FL that occurs concurrently in the same or other lymphoid tissues in 16-23% of cases. At diagnosis or thereafter, ISFL may also be associated with other lymphoid malignancies including splenic marginal zone lymphoma, CLL/SLL, marginal zone lymphoma, peripheral T-cell lymphoma not otherwise specified, and classical Hodgkin lymphoma.

==== Differential diagnosis ====
ISFL is distinguished form reactive hyperplastic germinal centers by the presence of lymphocytes that expression the markers cited in the previous section, particularly Bcl2. However, ISFL is associated with overt FL that occurs concurrently in the same or other lymphoid tissues in 16-23% of cases. Screening studies such as CT scans and bone marrow examinations are recommended to determine the presence of splenic FL, marginal zone lymphoma, CLL/SLL, peripheral T-cell lymphoma not otherwise specified, or classical Hodgkin lymphoma.

=== ISMCL ===
The diagnosis of ISMCL requires that sensitive immunochemistry methods find that the marginal zone of germinal centers of involved lymph follicles contain lymphocytes that strongly express cyclin D1 due to a t(11:14)(q13:q32) translocation. These germinal centers typically exhibit reactive hyperplasia. The neoplastic lymphocytes usually also express CD20, SOX11, and immunoglobulin D but usually do not express two markers that are commonly expressed in MCL, CD5 and CD43. The cyclin D1-expressing lymphocytes generally populate the inner layers of the marginal zone but on occasion some of these cells may be identified in the germinal centers surrounded by these marginal zones as well as in the bone marrow. The cells do not disrupt the overall architecture of the involved follicles. At the time of diagnoses, ISMCL is occasionally found to be associated with overt MCL in the same or other tissues and at diagnosis or sometime thereafter may be associated with CLL/SLL, marginal zone lymphoma, and FL.

==== Differential diagnosis ====
ISMCL is distinguished from reactive germinal center hyperplasia by the presence of mantle zone lymphocytes that express cyclin D1 as well as the other markers described above. Screening studies such as CT scans and bone marrow examinations are recommended to determine if MCL, CLL/SLL, marginal zone lymphoma, or FL is present.

== Treatment ==
The treatment of both In situ lymphoid neoplasia subtypes, when not associated with the presence of the lymphoid malignancies described above, is regular follow-ups to check for the development of these malignancies. Follow-up of 33 patients with ISFL over a period of 12 to 132 months diagnosed FL with times of progression of 15 and 29 months in two (6% of all followed) patients. Studies on the development of other types of lymphoid malignancies in ISFL are based primarily on case reports. Single studies suggest that ISFL patients who present with high levels of circulating t(13:18)(q32:q21) translocation-positive lymphocytes or Bcl2-positive lymphocytes that have mutations in the EZH2 gene are at increased risk of, and/or have a shorten time before developing, FL. Follow-up studies of patients with ISMCL are limited. ISMCL has been found to have been present 2–86 months prior to patients developing MCL but only 1 of 15 patients who were followed for >1 year developed the malignance. It has been suggested that mutations in the ATM and CHK2 genes may be associated with an increase risk of, and/or a shorten time before developing, MCL. In situ lymphoid neoplasia patients who have or develop FL, MCL, or other lymphoid malignancy are treated for their malignancies.
