= Persistent polyclonal B-cell lymphocytosis =

Persistent polyclonal B-cell lymphocytosis (PPBL) is an anomaly of the human immune system characterized by mildly elevated levels of white blood cells (called leukocytosis), chronic, stable absolute polyclonal B-cell lymphocytosis, elevated polyclonal IgM and binucleated cells. Although cases of non-smoking women or men have been reported, patients are predominantly young smoking women.

== Signs and symptoms ==
Ten percent of patients present with splenomegaly and lymphadenopathy. Some patients report a varying degree of fatigue, consistent with a chronic fatigue syndrome, or postviral fatigue as seen in EBV infections while others remain asymptomatic.

== Genetics ==
Genetically, PPBL has been associated with a few unusual genetic characteristics. Among them, it is associated with a particular genetic variant of the human leukocyte antigen called HLA-DR7. This variant is normally present in 26% in the Caucasian population. Chromosome analysis has detected an isochromosome +i(3q), with or without premature chromosome condensation. Also, a t(14;18)(q22;21) bcl-2/IgH rearrangement has been described, as usually seen in follicular lymphoma. Immunologically, peripheral B-cells show more functional IgD+ positive CD27 cells than usual.

== Prognosis ==
In the followup of 111 patients, most remained stable and event free. However, two patients developed IgM gammopathy 2 lung cancer; one developed cervical cancer and three developed non-Hodgkin's lymphoma. The possibility of developing a clonal proliferation, malignant lymphoma or secondary solid cancer led the authors to conclude not to classify PPBL as a benign pathology, as has been previously postulated but rather to recommend a careful and continued clinical and biological longterm follow-up.
