= Epratuzumab =

Monoclonal antibody

Monoclonal antibody
- Type: Whole antibody
- Source: Humanized (from mouse)
- Target: CD22

Clinical data
- Trade names: LymphoCide
- ATC code: none

Legal status
- Legal status: Investigational

Identifiers
- CAS Number: 205923-57-5
- PubChem SID: 47206001
- IUPHAR/BPS: 8088
- DrugBank: DB04958
- ChemSpider: none
- UNII: 3062P60MH9
- KEGG: D04036

Epratuzumab (planned trade name LymphoCide) is a humanized monoclonal antibody. Potential uses may be found in oncology and in treatment of inflammatory autoimmune disorders, such as systemic lupus erythematosus (SLE).

== Clinical trials ==
A clinical trial for relapsed adult acute lymphoblastic leukemia (ALL) has reported initial results.

Results have been published for a phase II trial in untreated follicular lymphoma.

Early results from a phase II trial for Diffuse large B-cell lymphoma (DLBCL) were encouraging.

The manufacturers in August 2009 announced success in early trials against SLE, and started two Phase III clinical trials.
July 2015 : Both phase III trials (EMBODY1/2) for SLE failed to meet their primary endpoint.

== Mechanism of action ==
Epratuzumab binds to the glycoprotein CD22 of mature and malignant B-cells.

Elevated CD22 and other B-cell receptor (BCR) proteins are associated with SLE. "Epratuzumab's mechanism of action transfers these BCR proteins to helper cells called effector cells which reduces B-cell destruction and epratuzumab's impact on the body's immune system" via a process called trogocytosis. Other SLE therapies destroy B-cells which compromises the immune system.
