= DEL17P13.1 =

Protein-coding gene in humans

Chromosome 17p13.1 deletion syndrome is a phenotype in humans that is designed DEL17P13.1.
