= HIST1H1E =

Protein-coding gene in the species Homo sapiens

H1-4
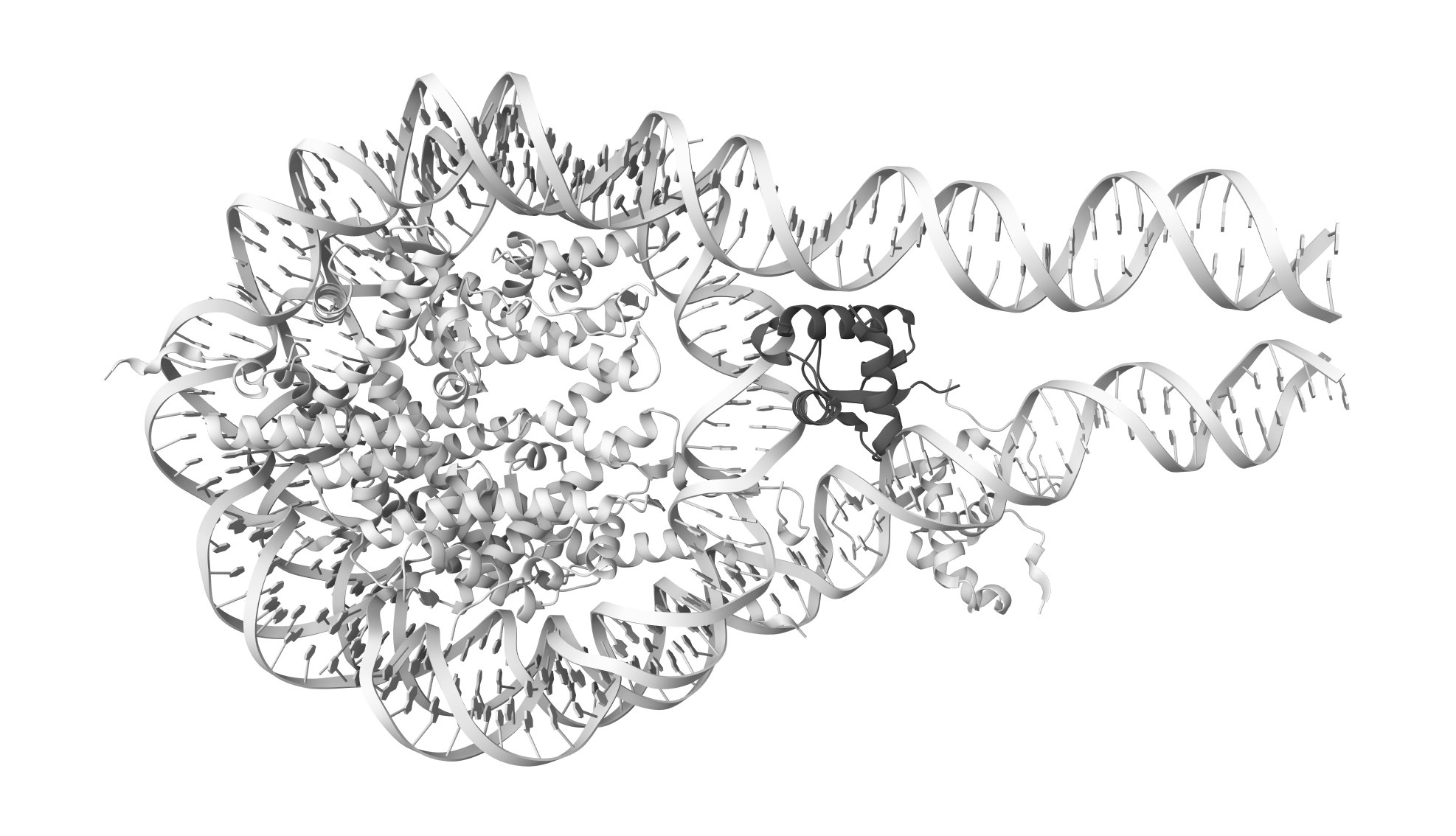

Identifiers
- Aliases: H1-4, histone cluster 1, H1e, H1.4, H1E, H1F4, H1s-4, dJ221C16.5, histone cluster 1 H1 family member e, RMNS, HIST1H1E, H1.4 linker histone, cluster member
- External IDs: OMIM: 142220; MGI: 1931527; GeneCards: H1-4
Available structures
PDB	Ortholog search: PDBe RCSB
PDB	List of PDB id codes 3TZD, 5JJZ

Gene location (Human)
Chr.	Chromosome 6 (human)
Band	6p22.2	Start	26,156,329 bp
Band	6p22.2	End	26,157,115 bp

Gene location (Mouse)
Chr.	Chromosome 13 (mouse)
Band	13|13 A3.1	Start	23,804,612 bp
Band	13|13 A3.1	End	23,806,541 bp
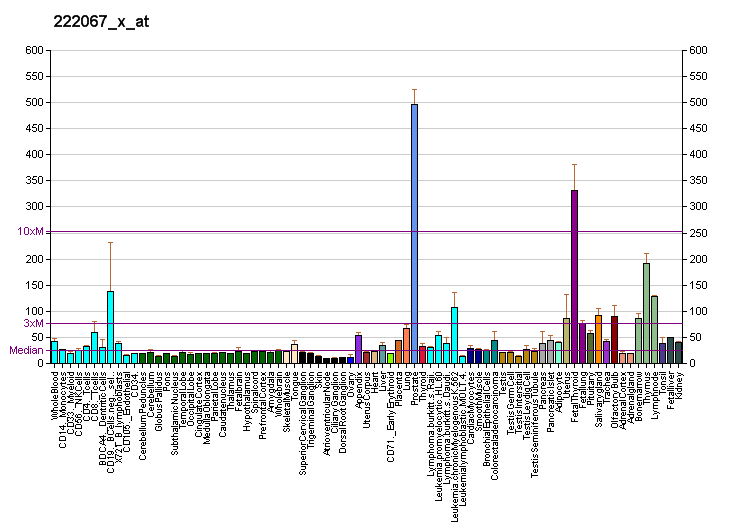

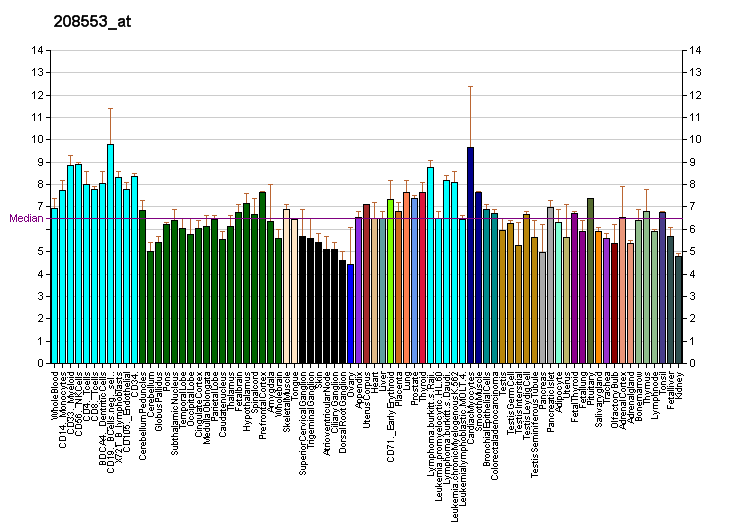
RNA expression pattern
Bgee	Human / Mouse (ortholog); Top expressed in: Achilles tendon; tendon of biceps brachii; sural nerve; epithelium of colon; testicle; bone marrow cell; gonad; corpus callosum; secondary oocyte; muscle of thigh / Top expressed in: genital tubercle; ascending aorta; aortic valve; tail of embryo; embryo; muscle of thigh; embryo; granulocyte; zygote; morula; More reference expression data
BioGPS	More reference expression data
Gene ontology
Molecular function	DNA binding; chromatin DNA binding; protein binding; RNA binding; nucleotide binding; double-stranded DNA binding; calcium ion binding; ATP binding; GTP binding; AMP binding; dATP binding; ADP binding; nucleosomal DNA binding
Cellular component	nucleosome; extracellular exosome; nucleus; chromosome
Biological process	regulation of transcription by RNA polymerase II; histone H3-K4 trimethylation; nucleosome assembly; negative regulation of transcription by RNA polymerase II; histone H3-K27 trimethylation; regulation of transcription, DNA-templated; chromosome condensation; negative regulation of DNA recombination
Sources:Amigo / QuickGO
Orthologs
Databases	NCBI: entry; OMA: entry
Species	Human	Mouse
Entrez	3008	50709
Ensembl	ENSG00000168298	ENSMUSG00000051627
UniProt	P10412	P43274
RefSeq (mRNA)	NM_005321	NM_015787
RefSeq (protein)	NP_005312; NP_005312.1	NP_056602
Location (UCSC)	Chr 6: 26.16 – 26.16 Mb	Chr 13: 23.8 – 23.81 Mb
PubMed search
- Wikidata
View/Edit Human	View/Edit Mouse

Histone H1.4 is a protein that in humans is encoded by the HIST1H1E gene.

Histones are basic nuclear proteins responsible for nucleosome structure of the chromosomal fiber in eukaryotes. Two molecules of each of the four core histones (H2A, H2B, H3, and H4) form an octamer, around which approximately 146 bp of DNA is wrapped in repeating units, called nucleosomes. The linker histone, H1, interacts with linker DNA between nucleosomes and functions in the compaction of chromatin into higher order structures. This gene is intronless and encodes a member of the histone H1 family. Transcripts from this gene lack polyA tails but instead contain a palindromic termination element. This gene is found in the large histone gene cluster on chromosome 6.

== HIST1H1E syndrome ==
HIST1H1E syndrome is a rare autosomal dominant disorder caused by a heterozygous pathogenic variant in the HIST1H1E gene, which is characterized by a set of recognizable clinical features such as hypotonia, intellectual disability, behavioral issues, skeletal, testes (undescended) and thyroid, heart anomalies, and ectodermal issues.
