= Galiximab =

Monoclonal antibody

Monoclonal antibody
- Type: Whole antibody
- Source: Chimeric (primate/human)
- Target: CD80

Clinical data
- ATC code: none

Identifiers
- CAS Number: 357613-77-5
- ChemSpider: none
- UNII: S9OX9692ZB
- KEGG: D04295

Galiximab is a monoclonal antibody designed for the treatment of B-cell lymphoma. As of September 2009, it is undergoing Phase III clinical trials. The drug is a chimeric antibody from Macaca irus and Homo sapiens.
