= List of therapeutic monoclonal antibodies =

Therapeutic, diagnostic and preventive monoclonal antibodies are clones of a single parent cell. When used as drugs, the International Nonproprietary Names (INNs) end in -mab. The remaining syllables of the INNs, as well as the column Source, are explained in Nomenclature of monoclonal antibodies.

Types of monoclonal antibodies with other structures than naturally occurring antibodies

The abbreviations in the column Type are as follows:

- mab: whole monoclonal antibody
- Fab: fragment, antigen-binding (one arm)
  - F(ab')_{2}: fragment, antigen-binding, including hinge region (both arms)
  - Fab': fragment, antigen-binding, including hinge region (one arm)
- Variable fragments:
  - scFv: single-chain variable fragment
  - di-scFv: dimeric single-chain variable fragment
  - sdAb: single-domain antibody
- BsAb: bispecific monoclonal antibody:
  - 3funct: trifunctional antibody
  - BiTE: bi-specific T-cell engager

This list of over 500 monoclonal antibodies includes approved and investigational drugs as well as drugs that have been withdrawn from market; consequently, the column Use does not necessarily indicate clinical usage. See the list of FDA-approved therapeutic monoclonal antibodies in the monoclonal antibody therapy page.

Name	Brand name	Type	Source	Target	Approved	Use
3F8		mab	mouse	GD2 ganglioside		neuroblastoma
Abagovomab		mab	mouse	CA-125 (imitation)		ovarian cancer
Abciximab	ReoPro	Fab	chimeric	CD41 (integrin alpha-IIb)	Discontinued in the U.S. as of April 2019	platelet aggregation inhibitor
Abituzumab		mab	humanized	CD51		cancer
Abrezekimab		Fab	humanized	IL-13		
Abrilumab		mab	human	integrin α_{4} β_{7}		inflammatory bowel disease, ulcerative colitis, Crohn's disease
Actoxumab		mab	human	Clostridioides difficile		Clostridioides difficile colitis
Adalimumab	Humira	mab	human	TNF-α	Y	rheumatoid arthritis, Crohn's disease, plaque psoriasis, psoriatic arthritis, ankylosing spondylitis, juvenile idiopathic arthritis, hemolytic disease of the newborn hidradentis suppuraatva
Adecatumumab		mab	human	EpCAM		prostate and breast cancer
Aducanumab	Aduhelm	mab	human	Amyloid beta	Y (Withdrawn)	Alzheimer's disease
Afasevikumab		mab	human	IL-17A, IL-17F		multiple sclerosis
Afelimomab		F(ab')_{2}	mouse	TNF-α		sepsis
Alacizumab pegol		F(ab')_{2}	humanized	VEGFR2		cancer
Alemtuzumab	Lemtrada, Campath	mab	humanized	CD52	Y	multiple sclerosis
Alirocumab	Praluent	mab	human	PCSK9	Y	hypercholesterolemia
Altumomab pentetate	Hybri-ceaker	mab	mouse	Carcinoembryonic antigen (CEA)		colorectal cancer (diagnosis)
Amatuximab		mab	chimeric	mesothelin		cancer
Amivantamab	Rybrevant	BsAb	human	Epidermal growth factor receptor (EGFR), cMet	Y	non-small cell lung cancer
Anatumomab mafenatox		Fab	mouse	Tumor-associated glycoprotein 72 (TAG-72)		non-small cell lung cancer
Andecaliximab		mab	chimeric	gelatinase B		gastric cancer or gastroesophageal junction adenocarcinoma
Anetumab ravtansine		mab	human	mesothelin (MSLN)		cancer
Anifrolumab	Saphnelo	mab	human	IFN-α/β receptor	Y	systemic lupus erythematosus
Ansuvimab	Ebanga	mab	human	Ebola virus glycoprotein	Y	treatment of Zaire ebolavirus (Ebola virus)
Anrukinzumab (= IMA-638)		mab	humanized	IL-13		asthma
Apitegromab	Isembyld	mab	human	proforms of myostatin	Y	Spinal muscular atrophy
Apolizumab		mab	humanized	HLA-DR		hematological cancers
Aprutumab ixadotin		mab	human	FGFR2		
Arcitumomab	CEA-Scan	Fab'	mouse	Carcinoembryonic antigen (CEA)		gastrointestinal cancers (diagnosis)
Ascrinvacumab		mab	human	activin receptor-like kinase 1		cancer
Aselizumab		mab	humanized	L-selectin (CD62L)		severely injured patients
Atezolizumab	Tecentriq	mab	humanized	PD-L1	Y	cancer
Atidortoxumab		mab	human	Staphylococcus aureus alpha toxin		
Atinumab		mab	human	RTN4		
Atoltivimab		mab	human	Ebola virus glycoprotein		part of Atoltivimab/maftivimab/odesivimab for treatment of Zaire ebolavirus (Ebola virus)
Atoltivimab/maftivimab/odesivimab	Inmazeb	mab	human		Y	treatment of Zaire ebolavirus (Ebola virus)
Atorolimumab		mab	human	Rhesus factor		hemolytic disease of the newborn
Avelumab	Bavencio	mab	human	PD-L1	Y	cancer
Axatilimab	Niktimvo	mab	humanized	CSF1R	Y	chronic graft-versus-host disease
Azintuxizumab vedotin		mab	chimeric/ humanized	CD319		cancer
Bamlanivimab		mab	human	spike protein receptor binding domain (RBD) of SARS-CoV-2	US emergency use authorization (EUA) when used with etesevimab	COVID-19
Bapineuzumab		mab	humanized	β-amyloid		Alzheimer's disease
Basiliximab	Simulect	mab	chimeric	CD25 (α chain of IL-2 receptor)	Y	prevention of organ transplant rejections
Bavituximab		mab	chimeric	phosphatidylserine		cancer, viral infections
BCD-100			human	PD-1		melanoma
Bebtelovimab		mab	human	spike protein receptor binding domain (RBD) of SARS-CoV-2	US emergency use authorization (EUA)	COVID-19
Bectumomab	LymphoScan	Fab'	mouse	CD22		non-Hodgkin's lymphoma (detection)
Bedinvetmab	Librela	mab	veterinary	nerve growth factor (NGF)	Y	pain associated with osteoarthritis in dogs
Begelomab		mab	mouse	DPP4		
Belantamab mafodotin	Blenrep	mab	humanized	B-cell maturation antigen (BCMA)	reapproved by the FDA and the EMA in 2025	relapsed or refractory multiple myeloma
Belimumab	Benlysta	mab	human	B-cell activating factor (BAFF)	Y	systemic lupus erythematosus without renal or CNS involvement
Bemarituzumab		mab	humanized	FGFR2		gastric cancer or gastroesophageal junction adenocarcinoma
Benralizumab	Fasenra	mab	humanized	CD125	Y	asthma
Berlimatoxumab		mab	human	Staphylococcus aureus bi-component leukocidin		
Bermekimab	Xilonix	mab	human	IL-1α		colorectal cancer
Bersanlimab		mab	human	ICAM-1		
Bertilimumab		mab	human	CCL11 (eotaxin-1)		severe allergic disorders
Besilesomab	Scintimun	mab	mouse	Carcinoembryonic antigen (CEA)-related antigen		inflammatory lesions and metastases (detection)
Bevacizumab	Avastin	mab	humanized	VEGF-A	Y	metastatic cancer, retinopathy of prematurity
Bezlotoxumab	Zinplava	mab	human	Clostridioides difficile	Y	Clostridioides difficile colitis
Biciromab	FibriScint	Fab'	mouse	fibrin II, beta chain		thromboembolism (diagnosis)
Bimagrumab		mab	human	ACVR2B		myostatin inhibitor
Bimekizumab	Bimzelx	mab	humanized	IL-17A, IL-17F, IL-17AF	Y	psoriasis
Birtamimab		mab	chimeric	serum amyloid A protein		amyloidosis
Bivatuzumab		mab	humanized	CD44 v6		squamous cell carcinoma
Bleselumab		mab	human	CD40		organ transplant rejection
Blinatumomab	Blincyto	BiTE	mouse	CD19	Y	pre-B Acute lymphoblastic leukemia (ALL) (CD19+)
Blontuvetmab	Blontress	mab	veterinary	CD20		
Blosozumab		mab	humanized	SOST		osteoporosis
Bococizumab		mab	humanized	PCSK9		dyslipidemia
Brazikumab		mab	human	IL-23		Crohn's disease
Brentuximab vedotin	Adcentris	mab	chimeric	CD30 (TNFRSF8)	Y	Hodgkin's lymphoma, anaplastic large-cell lymphoma
Briakinumab		mab	human	IL-12, IL-23		psoriasis, rheumatoid arthritis, inflammatory bowel diseases, multiple sclerosis
Brodalumab	Siliq	mab	human	IL-17	Y	Plaque psoriasis
Brolucizumab	Beovu	scFv	humanized	vascular endothelial growth factor A (VEGFA)	Y	wet age-related macular degeneration
Brontictuzumab		mab	humanized	Notch 1		cancer
Burosumab	Crysvita	mab	human	FGF 23	Y	X-linked hypophosphatemia
Cabiralizumab		mab	humanized	CSF1R		metastatic pancreatic cancer
Camidanlumab tesirine		mab	human	CD25 (α chain of IL-2 receptor)		B-cell Hodgkin's lymphoma, non-Hodgkin lymphoma, acute lymphoblastic leukemia, acute myeloid leukemia
Camrelizumab		mab	humanized	PD-1		hepatocellular carcinoma
Canakinumab	Ilaris	mab	human	IL-1	Y	cryopyrin-associated periodic syndrome, Yao Syndrome, Adult Onset Still's Disease
Cantuzumab mertansine		mab	humanized	CanAg (a glycoform of MUC1)		colorectal cancer etc.
Cantuzumab ravtansine		mab	humanized	CanAg (a glycoform of MUC1)		cancers
Caplacizumab	Cablivi	sdAb	humanized	VWF	Y	thrombotic thrombocytopenic purpura, thrombosis
Capromab	Prostascint	mab	mouse	Glutamate carboxypeptidase II	Y	prostate cancer (detection)
Carlumab		mab	human	MCP-1		oncology/immune indications
Carotuximab		mab	chimeric	endoglin		angiosarcoma
Catumaxomab	Removab	3funct	rat/mouse hybrid	EpCAM, CD3	Y	ovarian cancer, malignant ascites, gastric cancer
cBR96-doxorubicin immunoconjugate		mab	humanized	Lewis-Y antigen		cancer
Casirivimab		mab	human	spike protein receptor binding domain (RBD) of SARS-CoV-2	Yes when used with imdevimab	COVID-19
Cedelizumab		mab	humanized	CD4		prevention of organ transplant rejections, treatment of autoimmune diseases
Cemiplimab	Libtayo	mab	human	PD-1	Y	cutaneous squamous cell carcinoma
Cergutuzumab amunaleukin		mab	humanized	IL-2		cancer
Certolizumab pegol	Cimzia	Fab'	humanized	TNF-α	Y	Crohn's disease, rheumatoid arthritis, axial spondyloarthritis, psoriasis arthritis
Cetrelimab		mab	human	PD-1		cancer
Cetuximab	Erbitux	mab	chimeric	Epidermal growth factor receptor (EGFR)	Y	metastatic colorectal cancer and head and neck cancer
Cetuximab beta	Enlituo	mab		EGFR	Y (China)	metastatic colorectal cancer
Cibisatamab		mab	humanized	CEACAM5		cancer
Cilgavimab		mab	human	spike protein receptor binding domain (RBD) of SARS-CoV-2	US emergency use authorization (EUA) when used with tixagevimab	COVID-19
Cirmtuzumab			humanized	ROR1		chronic lymphocytic leukemia
Citatuzumab bogatox		Fab	humanized	EpCAM		ovarian cancer and other solid tumors
Cixutumumab		mab	human	IGF-1 receptor (CD221)		solid tumors
Clazakizumab		mab	humanized	IL-6		rheumatoid arthritis
Clenoliximab		mab	chimeric	CD4		rheumatoid arthritis
Clesrovimab	Enflonsia	mab	human	respiratory syncytial virus F protein	Y	respiratory syncytial virus (prevention)
Clivatuzumab tetraxetan	hPAM4-Cide	mab	humanized	MUC1		pancreatic cancer
Codrituzumab		mab	humanized	glypican 3		cancer
Cofetuzumab pelidotin		mab	humanized	PTK7		cancer
Coltuximab ravtansine		mab	chimeric	CD19		cancer
Conatumumab		mab	human	TRAIL-R2		cancer
Concizumab	Alhemo	mab	humanized	tissue factor pathway inhibitor (TFPI)	Y	bleeding with hemophilia
Cosfroviximab	ZMapp	mab	chimeric	ebolavirus glycoprotein		Ebola virus
Cosibelimab	Unloxcyt	mab	human	Programmed death ligand-1 (PD-L1)	Y	cutaneous squamous cell carcinoma
Crenezumab		mab	humanized	β-amyloid (1-40 and 1-42)		Alzheimer's disease
Crizanlizumab	Adakveo	mab	humanized	selectin P	Y	sickle-cell disease
Crotedumab		mab	human	glucagon receptor (GCGR)		diabetes
Crovalimab	Piasky	mab	humanized	C5	Y	paroxysmal nocturnal hemoglobinuria
CR6261		mab	human	Hemagglutinin (influenza)		infectious disease/influenza A
Cusatuzumab		mab	humanized	CD70		cancer
Dacetuzumab		mab	humanized	CD40		hematologic cancers
Daclizumab	Zenapax	mab	humanized	CD25 (α chain of IL-2 receptor)	Y	prevention of organ transplant rejections, multiple sclerosis
Dalotuzumab		mab	humanized	IGF-1 receptor (CD221)		cancer etc.
Dapirolizumab pegol		mab	humanized	CD154 (CD40L)		
Daratumumab	Darzalex	mab	human	CD38	Y	multiple myeloma
Dectrekumab		mab	human	IL-13		
Demcizumab		mab	humanized	DLL4		cancer
Denintuzumab mafodotin		mab	humanized	CD19		cancer
Denosumab	Prolia and Xgeva	mab	human	RANKL	Y	osteoporosis, bone metastases etc.
Depatuxizumab mafodotin		mab	chimeric/ humanized	EGFR		glioblastoma
Depemokimab	Exdensur	mab	humanized	IL-5	Y	asthma
Derlotuximab biotin		mab	chimeric	histone complex		recurrent glioblastoma multiforme
Detumomab		mab	mouse	B-lymphoma cell		lymphoma
Dezamizumab		mab	humanized	serum amyloid P component		
Dinutuximab	Unituxin	mab	chimeric	GD2 ganglioside	Y	neuroblastoma
Dinutuximab beta	Qarziba	mab	chimeric	GD2 ganglioside	Y	neuroblastoma
Diridavumab		mab	human	Hemagglutinin (influenza)		influenza A
Divozilimab	Ivlizi	mab	humanized	CD20	Y (Russia)	multiple sclerosis
Domagrozumab		mab	humanized	GDF-8		Duchenne muscular dystrophy
Donanemab	Kisunla	mab	humanized	Amyloid beta	Y	Alzheimer's disease
Dorlimomab aritox		F(ab')_{2}	mouse			
Dostarlimab	Jemperli	mab	humanized	PCDP1	Y	endometrial cancer
Drozitumab		mab	human	DR5		cancer etc.
DS-8201			humanized	HER2		gastric or gastroesophageal junction adenocarcinoma
Duligotuzumab		mab	humanized	ERBB3 (HER3)		testicular cancer
Dupilumab	Dupixent	mab	human	IL-4Rα	Y	atopic dermatitis, asthma, nasal polyps
Durvalumab	Imfinzi	mab	human	PD-L1	Y	cancer
Dusigitumab		mab	human	IGF-2		B-cell malignancies
Duvortuxizumab		scFv	chimeric/ humanized	CD19, CD3E		cancer
Ecromeximab		mab	chimeric	GD3 ganglioside		malignant melanoma
Eculizumab	Soliris	mab	humanized	C5	Y	paroxysmal nocturnal hemoglobinuria, atypical hemolytic uremic syndrome
Edobacomab		mab	mouse	endotoxin		sepsis caused by Gram-negative bacteria
Edrecolomab	Panorex	mab	mouse	EpCAM		colorectal carcinoma
Efalizumab	Raptiva	mab	humanized	LFA-1 (CD11a)		psoriasis (blocks T-cell migration)
Efungumab	Mycograb	scFv	human	Hsp90		invasive Candida infection
Eldelumab		mab	human	CXCL10 (IP-10)		Crohn's disease, ulcerative colitis
Elezanumab		mab	human	repulsive guidance molecule A (RGMA)		spinal cord injury and multiple sclerosis
Elgemtumab		mab	human	ERBB3 (HER3)		cancer
Elotuzumab	Empliciti	mab	humanized	SLAMF7	Y	multiple myeloma
Elsilimomab		mab	mouse	IL-6		
Emactuzumab		mab	humanized	CSF1R		cancer
Emapalumab	Gamifant	mab	human	IFN-γ	Y	hemophagocytic lymphohistiocytosis
Emibetuzumab		mab	humanized	HGFR		cancer
Emicizumab	Hemlibra	BsAb	humanized	activated F9, F10	Y	haemophilia A
Enapotamab vedotin		mab	human	AXL		cancer
Enavatuzumab		mab	humanized	TWEAK receptor		cancer etc.
Enfortumab vedotin	Padcev	mab	human	nectin-4	Y	urothelial cancer
Enlimomab pegol		mab	mouse	ICAM-1 (CD54)		
Enoblituzumab		mab	humanized	CD276		cancer
Enokizumab		mab	humanized	IL-9		asthma
Enoticumab		mab	human	DLL4		
Ensituximab		mab	chimeric	MUC5AC		cancer
Epcoritamab	Epkinly	BiTE	humanized	CD3, CD20	Y	diffuse large B-cell lymphoma
Epitumomab cituxetan		mab	mouse	episialin		
Epratuzumab		mab	humanized	CD22		cancer, systemic lupus erythematosus (SLE)
Eptinezumab	Vyepti	mab	humanized	calcitonin gene-related peptide	Y	migraine
Erenumab	Aimovig	mab	human	calcitonin gene-related peptide receptor (CGRP)	Y	migraine
Erlizumab		F(ab')_{2}	humanized	ITGB2 (CD18)		heart attack, stroke, traumatic shock
Ertumaxomab	Rexomun	3funct	rat/mouse hybrid	HER2/neu, CD3	Y	breast cancer etc.
Etaracizumab	Abegrin	mab	humanized	integrin α_{v}β_{3}	Y	melanoma, prostate cancer, ovarian cancer etc.
Etesevimab		mab	human	spike protein receptor binding domain (RBD) of SARS-CoV-2	US emergency use authorization (EUA) when used with bamlanivimab	COVID-19
Etigilimab		mab	humanized	TIGIT		
Etrolizumab		mab	humanized	integrin β_{7}		inflammatory bowel disease
Evinacumab	Evkeeza	mab	human	angiopoietin 3	Y	dyslipidemia
Evolocumab	Repatha	mab	human	PCSK9	Y	hypercholesterolemia
Exbivirumab		mab	human	hepatitis B surface antigen		hepatitis B
Fanolesomab	NeutroSpec	mab	mouse	CD15		appendicitis (diagnosis)
Faralimomab		mab	mouse	IFN receptor		
Faricimab	Vabysmo	mab	humanized	VEGF-A and Ang-2	Y	angiogenesis, ocular vascular diseases
Farletuzumab		mab	humanized	folate receptor 1		ovarian cancer
Fasinumab		mab	human	nerve growth factor (NGF)		acute sciatic pain
FBTA05	Lymphomun	3funct	rat/mouse hybrid	CD20		chronic lymphocytic leukaemia
Felvizumab		mab	humanized	respiratory syncytial virus		respiratory syncytial virus infection
Fezakinumab		mab	human	IL-22		rheumatoid arthritis, psoriasis
Fibatuzumab		mab	humanized	ephrin receptor A3		
Ficlatuzumab		mab	humanized	Hepatocyte growth factor (HGF)		cancer etc.
Figitumumab		mab	human	IGF-1 receptor (CD221)		adrenocortical carcinoma, non-small cell lung carcinoma etc.
Firivumab		mab	human	Hemagglutinin (influenza)		
Flanvotumab		mab	human	TYRP1 (glycoprotein 75)		melanoma
Fletikumab		mab	human	IL-20		rheumatoid arthritis
Flotetuzumab		di-scFv	humanized	IL-3 receptor		hematological malignancies
Fontolizumab	HuZAF	mab	humanized	IFN-γ		Crohn's disease etc.
Foralumab		mab	human	CD3E		
Foravirumab		mab	human	rabies virus glycoprotein		rabies (prophylaxis)
Fremanezumab	Ajovy	mab	humanized	calcitonin gene-related peptide alpha and beta	Y	migraine
Fresolimumab		mab	human	TGF-β		idiopathic pulmonary fibrosis, focal segmental glomerulosclerosis, cancer
Frovocimab		mab	humanized	PCSK9		hypercholesterolemia
Frunevetmab	Solensia	mab	veterinary	nerve growth factor (NGF)	Y	pain associated with osteoarthritis in cats
Fulranumab		mab	human	nerve growth factor (NGF)		pain
Futuximab		mab	chimeric	Epidermal growth factor receptor (EGFR)		cancer
Galcanezumab	Emgality	mab	humanized	calcitonin	Y	migraine
Galiximab		mab	chimeric	CD80		B-cell lymphoma
Gancotamab		scFv	human	HER2/neu		cancer
Ganitumab		mab	human	IGF-1 receptor (CD221)		cancer
Gantenerumab		mab	human	β-amyloid (1-40 and 1-42)		Alzheimer's disease
Garadacimab	Andembry	mab	human	Coagulation factor XIIa	Y	hereditary angioedema
Garetosmab	Pasatru	mab	human	Activin-A	Y	Fibrodysplasia ossificans progressiva
Gatipotuzumab		mab	humanized	MUC1		cancer
Gavilimomab		mab	mouse	CD147 (basigin)		graft versus host disease
Gedivumab		mab	human	Hemagglutinin (influenza)		
Gemtuzumab ozogamicin	Mylotarg	mab	humanized	CD33	Y	acute myelogenous leukemia
Gevokizumab		mab	humanized	IL-1β		diabetes etc.
Gilvetmab		mab	veterinary	PCDC1		
Gimsilumab		mab	human	CSF2		rheumatoid arthritis
Girentuximab	Rencarex	mab	chimeric	carbonic anhydrase 9 (CA-IX)		clear cell renal cell carcinoma
Glembatumumab vedotin		mab	human	GPNMB		melanoma, breast cancer
Glofitamab	Columvi	BsAb	humanized	CD20, CD3	Y	diffuse large B-cell lymphoma
Golimumab	Simponi	mab	human	TNF-α	Y	rheumatoid arthritis, psoriatic arthritis, ankylosing spondylitis
Gomiliximab		mab	chimeric	CD23 (IgE receptor)		allergic asthma
Gosuranemab		mab	humanized	tau protein		progressive supranuclear palsy
Guselkumab	Tremfya	mab	human	IL-23	Y	psoriasis
Ianalumab		mab	human	BAFF-R		autoimmune hepatitis, Sjögren's disease
Ibalizumab	Trogarzo	mab	humanized	CD4	Y	HIV infection
Sintilimab	Tyvyt	mab	human	PD-1	Y(China)	hodgkin's lymphoma
Ibritumomab tiuxetan	Zevalin	mab	mouse	CD20	Y	non-Hodgkin's lymphoma
Icrucumab		mab	human	VEGFR-1		cancer etc.
Idarucizumab	Praxbind	Fab	humanized	dabigatran	Y	reversal of anticoagulant effects of dabigatran
Ifabotuzumab		mab	humanized	EPHA3		glioblastoma multiforme
Igovomab	Indimacis-125	F(ab')_{2}	mouse	CA-125		ovarian cancer (diagnosis)
Iladatuzumab vedotin		mab	humanized	CD79B		cancer
Imalumab		mab	human	macrophage migration inhibitory factor (MIF)		cancer
Imaprelimab		mab	humanized	melanoma cell adhesion molecule (MCAM)		
Imciromab	Myoscint	mab	mouse	cardiac myosin	Y	cardiac imaging
Imdevimab		mab	human	spike protein receptor binding domain (RBD) of SARS-CoV-2	Yes when used with casirivimab	COVID-19
Imgatuzumab		mab	humanized	Epidermal growth factor receptor (EGFR)		cancer
Inclacumab		mab	human	selectin P		cardiovascular disease
Indatuximab ravtansine		mab	chimeric	SDC1		cancer
Indusatumab vedotin		mab	human	GUCY2C		cancer
Inebilizumab	Uplizna	mab	humanized	CD19	Y	cancer, systemic sclerosis, multiple sclerosis
Infliximab	Remicade	mab	chimeric	TNF-α	Y	rheumatoid arthritis, ankylosing spondylitis, psoriatic arthritis, psoriasis, Crohn's disease, ulcerative colitis
Intetumumab		mab	human	CD51		solid tumors (prostate cancer, melanoma)
Inolimomab		mab	mouse	CD25 (α chain of IL-2 receptor)		graft versus host disease
Inotuzumab ozogamicin	Besponsa	mab	humanized	CD22	Y	Acute lymphoblastic leukemia (ALL)
Ipilimumab	Yervoy	mab	human	CD152	Y	melanoma
Iomab-B			mouse	CD45		ablation of bone marrow
Iratumumab		mab	human	CD30 (TNFRSF8)		Hodgkin's lymphoma
Isatuximab	Sarclisa	mab	chimeric	CD38	Y	multiple myeloma
Iscalimab		mab	human	CD40		
Istiratumab		mab	human	IGF-1 receptor (CD221)		advanced solid tumors
Itolizumab	Alzumab	mab	humanized	CD6	Y	psoriasis
Ixekizumab	Taltz	mab	humanized	IL-17A	Y	autoimmune diseases
Izenivetmab	Lenivia	mab	veterinary	nerve growth factor (NGF)	Y	pain associated with osteoarthritis in dogs
KappaMAB		mab	mouse	Kappa Myeloma Antigen (KMA)		multiple myeloma
Keliximab		mab	chimeric	CD4		chronic asthma
Labetuzumab	CEA-Cide	mab	humanized	Carcinoembryonic antigen (CEA)		colorectal cancer
Lacnotuzumab		mab	humanized	CSF1, macrophage colony stimulating factor (MCSF)		cancer
Ladiratuzumab vedotin		mab	humanized	LIV-1		cancer
Lampalizumab		Fab	humanized	Complement factor D (CFD)		geographic atrophy secondary to age-related macular degeneration
Lanadelumab	Takhzyro	mab	human	kallikrein	Y	angioedema
Landogrozumab		mab	humanized	GDF-8		muscle wasting disorders
Laprituximab emtansine		mab	chimeric	epidermal growth factor receptor (EGFR)		
Larcaviximab		mab	chimeric	ebolavirus glycoprotein		Ebola virus
Lebrikizumab	Ebglyss	mab	humanized	IL-13		eczema
Lecanemab	Leqembi	mab	humanized	β-amyloid	Y	Alzheimer's disease
Lemalesomab		mab	mouse	NCA-90 (granulocyte antigen)		diagnostic agent
Lendalizumab		mab	humanized	C5		
Lenvervimab		mab	humanized	hepatitis B surfage antigen		hepatitis B
Lenzilumab		mab	human	CSF2		chronic myelomonocytic leukemia and juvenile myelomonocytic leukemia
Lerdelimumab		mab	human	TGF-β2		reduction of scarring after glaucoma surgery
Leronlimab		mab	humanized	CCR5		breast cancer, HIV
Lesofavumab		mab	human	Hemagglutinin (influenza)		
Letolizumab		scFv	humanized	tumor necrosis factor related activation protein (TRAP)		inflammatory diseases
Lexatumumab		mab	human	TRAIL-R2		cancer
Libivirumab		mab	human	hepatitis B surface antigen		hepatitis B
Lifastuzumab vedotin		mab	humanized	phosphate-sodium co-transporter		cancer
Ligelizumab		mab	humanized	IGHE		severe asthma, chronic spontaneous urticaria
Loncastuximab tesirine	Zynlonta	mab	chimeric	CD19	Y	relapsed or refractory large B-cell lymphoma
Losatuxizumab vedotin		mab	chimeric/ humanized	epidermal growth factor receptor (EGFR), ERBB1 (HER1)		cancer
Lilotomab satetraxetan		mab	mouse	CD37		cancer
Lintuzumab		mab	humanized	CD33		cancer
Linvoseltamab	Lynozyfic	BsAb	human	CD3 and B-cell maturation antigen (BCMA)	Y	multiple myeloma
Lirilumab		mab	human	KIR2D		solid and hematological cancers
Lodelcizumab		mab	humanized	PCSK9		hypercholesterolemia
Lokivetmab	Cytopoint	mab	veterinary	Canis lupus familiaris IL31	Y	clinical signs of atopic dermatitis in dogs
Lorvotuzumab mertansine		mab	humanized	CD56		cancer
Lucatumumab		mab	human	CD40		multiple myeloma, non-Hodgkin's lymphoma, Hodgkin's lymphoma
Lulizumab pegol		mab	humanized	CD28		autoimmune diseases
Lumiliximab		mab	chimeric	CD23 (IgE receptor)		chronic lymphocytic leukemia
Lumretuzumab		mab	humanized	ERBB3 (HER3)		cancer
Lupartumab		mab	human			
Lupartumab amadotin		mab	human	LYPD3		
Lutikizumab		mab	humanized	IL-1α		
Maftivimab		mab	human			part of Atoltivimab/maftivimab/odesivimab for treatment of Zaire ebolavirus (Ebola virus)
Mapatumumab		mab	human	TRAIL-R1		cancer
Margetuximab	Margenza	mab	humanized	HER2	Y	breast cancer
Marstacimab	Hympavzi	mab	human	tissue factor pathway inhibitor (TFPI)	Y	bleeding with hemophilia
Maslimomab			mouse	T-cell receptor		
Mavrilimumab		mab	human	GMCSF receptor α-chain		rheumatoid arthritis
Matuzumab		mab	humanized	Epidermal growth factor receptor (EGFR)		colorectal, lung and stomach cancer
Mepolizumab	Nucala	mab	humanized	IL-5	Y	asthma and white blood cell diseases
Metelimumab		mab	human	TGF-β1		systemic scleroderma
Milatuzumab		mab	humanized	CD74		multiple myeloma and other hematological malignancies
Minretumomab		mab	mouse	TAG-72		tumor detection (and therapy?)
Mirikizumab	Omvoh	mab	humanized	IL-23	Y	ulcerative colitis
Mirvetuximab soravtansine	Elahere	mab	chimeric	folate receptor alpha	Y	ovarian cancer
Mitumomab		mab	mouse	GD3 ganglioside		small cell lung carcinoma
Modotuximab		mab	chimeric	EGFR extracellular domain III		cancer
Mogamulizumab	Poteligeo	mab	humanized	CCR4	Y	adult T-cell leukemia/lymphoma
Monalizumab		mab	humanized	NKG2A		rheumatoid arthritis, gynecologic malignancies, and other cancers
Morolimumab		mab	human	Rhesus factor		
Mosunetuzumab	Lunsumio	BiTE	humanized	CD3E, MS4A1, CD20	Y	follicular lymphoma
Motavizumab	Numax	mab	humanized	respiratory syncytial virus		respiratory syncytial virus (prevention)
Moxetumomab pasudotox	Lumoxiti	mab	mouse	CD22	Y	hairy cell leukemia
Muromonab-CD3	Orthoclone OKT3	mab	mouse	CD3		prevention of organ transplant rejections
Nacolomab tafenatox		Fab	mouse	C242 antigen		colorectal cancer
Namilumab		mab	human	CSF2		
Naptumomab estafenatox		Fab	mouse	5T4		non-small cell lung carcinoma, renal cell carcinoma
Naratuximab emtansine		mab	chimeric	CD37		
Narnatumab		mab	human	MST1R (aka RON)		cancer
Narsoplimab	Yartemlea	mab	human	mannan-binding lectin-associated serine protease-2 (MASP-2)	Y	thrombotic microangiopathy
Natalizumab	Tysabri	mab	humanized	integrin α_{4}	Y	multiple sclerosis, Crohn's disease
Navicixizumab		mab	chimeric/ humanized	DLL4 and VEGFA		cancer
Navivumab		mab	human	Hemagglutinin (influenza)		
Naxitamab	Danyelza		humanized	GD2	Y	high-risk neuroblastoma and refractory osteosarcoma and Ewing sarcoma
Nebacumab		mab	human	endotoxin		sepsis
Necitumumab	Portrazza	mab	human	Epidermal growth factor receptor (EGFR)	Y	non-small cell lung carcinoma
Nemolizumab	Nemluvio	mab	humanized	IL-31 receptor A		eczema
NEOD001			humanized	amyloid		primary systemic amyloidosis
Nerelimomab		mab	mouse	TNF-α		
Nesvacumab		mab	human	angiopoietin 2		cancer
Netakimab	Efleira	mab	humanized	IL-17A	Y (Russia)	plaque psoriasis, psoriatic arthritis, ankylosing spondylitis
Nimotuzumab	BioMab-EGFR, Theracim, Theraloc	mab	humanized	epidermal growth factor receptor (EGFR)	Y	squamous cell carcinoma, head and neck cancer, nasopharyngeal cancer, glioma
Nipocalimab	Imaavy	mab	human	Neonatal fragment crystallizable receptor	Y	generalized myasthenia gravis, Sjögren's disease
Nirsevimab	Beyfortus	mab	human	RSV fusion glycoprotein		respiratory syncytial virus
Nivolumab	Opdivo	mab	human	PD-1	Y	cancer
Nofetumomab merpentan	Verluma	Fab	mouse			cancer (diagnosis)
Obiltoxaximab	Anthim	mab	chimeric	Bacillus anthracis anthrax	Y	Bacillus anthracis spores
Obinutuzumab	Gazyva	mab	humanized	CD20	Y	chronic lymphatic leukemia
Ocaratuzumab		mab	humanized	CD20		cancer
Ocrelizumab	Ocrevus	mab	humanized	CD20	Y	multiple sclerosis
Odesivimab		mab	human			part of Atoltivimab/maftivimab/odesivimab for treatment of Zaire ebolavirus (Ebola virus)
Odulimomab		mab	mouse	LFA-1 (CD11a)		prevention of organ transplant rejections, immunological diseases
Ofatumumab	Arzerra, Kesimpta	mab	human	CD20	Y	chronic lymphocytic leukemia, multiple sclerosis
Olaratumab	Lartruvo	mab	human	PDGFRA	Y	cancer
Oleclumab		mab	human	5'-nucleotidase		pancreatic and colorectal cancer
Olendalizumab		mab	humanized	complement C5a		systemic lupus erythematosus, lupus nephritis, acute graft-versus-host disease
Olokizumab		mab	humanized	IL-6		rheumatoid arthritis
Omalizumab	Xolair	mab	humanized	IgE Fc region	Y	allergic asthma, chronic spontaneous urticaria
Omburtamab		mab	mouse	CD276		cancer
OMS721			human	MASP-2		atypical hemolytic uremic syndrome
Onartuzumab		Fab	humanized	human scatter factor receptor kinase		cancer
Ontuxizumab		mab	chimeric/ humanized	TEM1		cancer
Onvatilimab		mab	human	VISTA (protein) (VSIR)		
Opicinumab		mab	human	LINGO-1		multiple sclerosis
Oportuzumab monatox	Vicinium	scFv	humanized	EpCAM		bladder cancer
Oregovomab	OvaRex	mab	mouse	CA-125		ovarian cancer
Orticumab		mab	human	oxLDL		
Otelixizumab		mab	chimeric/ humanized	CD3		diabetes mellitus type 1
Otilimab		mab	human	GMCSF		osteoarthritis, rheumatoid arthritis
Otlertuzumab		mab	humanized	CD37		cancer
Oxelumab		mab	human	OX-40		asthma
Ozanezumab		mab	humanized	NOGO-A		ALS and multiple sclerosis
Ozoralizumab		mab	humanized	TNF-α		inflammation
Pagibaximab		mab	chimeric	lipoteichoic acid		sepsis (Staphylococcus)
Palivizumab	Synagis, Abbosynagis	mab	humanized	F protein of respiratory syncytial virus	Y	respiratory syncytial virus (prevention)
Pamrevlumab		mab	human	connective tissue growth factor (CTGF)		idiopathic pulmonary fibrosis (IPF), pancreatic cancer
Panitumumab	Vectibix	mab	human	epidermal growth factor receptor (EGFR)	Y	colorectal cancer
Pankomab		mab	humanized	tumor specific glycosylation of MUC1		ovarian cancer
Panobacumab		mab	human	Pseudomonas aeruginosa		Pseudomonas aeruginosa infection
Parsatuzumab		mab	humanized	EGFL7		cancer
Pascolizumab		mab	humanized	IL-4		asthma
Pasotuxizumab		mab	chimeric/ humanized	folate hydrolase		cancer
Pateclizumab		mab	humanized	lymphotoxin alpha (LTA)		TNF
Patritumab		mab	human	ERBB3 (HER3)		cancer
PDR001			humanized	PD-1		melanoma
Pembrolizumab	Keytruda	mab	humanized	PD-1	Y	melanoma and other cancers
Pemivibart	Pemgarda	mab	human	spike protein receptor binding domain (RBD) of SARS-CoV-2	US emergency use authorization (EUA)	COVID-19
Pemtumomab	Theragyn		mouse	MUC1		cancer
Penpulimab		mab		PD-1	Y	cancer
Perakizumab		mab	humanized	IL-17A		arthritis
Pertuzumab	Perjeta	mab	humanized	HER2/neu	Y	cancer
Pexelizumab		scFv	humanized	C5		reduction of side effects of cardiac surgery
Pidilizumab		mab	humanized	PD-1		cancer and infectious diseases
Pinatuzumab vedotin		mab	humanized	CD22		cancer
Pintumomab		mab	mouse	adenocarcinoma antigen		adenocarcinoma (imaging)
Pivekimab sunirine	Decnupaz	mab	humanized	CD123	Y	blastic plasmacytoid dendritic cell neoplasm
Placulumab		mab	human	TNF		pain and inflammatory diseases
Pozelimab	Veopoz	mab	human	C5	Y	CHAPLE disease
Prezalumab		mab	human	TNF		
Plozalizumab		mab	humanized	CCR2		diabetic nephropathy and arteriovenous graft patency
Pogalizumab		mab	humanized	tumor necrosis factor receptor (TNFR) superfamily member 4		
Polatuzumab vedotin	Polivy	mab	humanized	CD79B	Y	diffuse large B-cell lymphoma
Ponezumab		mab	humanized	β-amyloid		Alzheimer's disease
Porgaviximab		mab	chimeric	Zaire ebolavirus glycoprotein		Ebola virus disease
Prasinezumab		mab	humanized	Alpha-synuclein		Parkinson's disease
Prezalizumab		mab	humanized	inducible T-cell co-stimulatory ligand (ICOSL)		
Priliximab		mab	chimeric	CD4		Crohn's disease, multiple sclerosis
Pritoxaximab		mab	chimeric	E. coli shiga toxin type-1		
Pritumumab		mab	human	vimentin		brain cancer
PRO 140			humanized	CCR5		HIV infection
Quilizumab		mab	humanized	IGHE		asthma
Racotumomab	Vaxira	mab	mouse	NGNA ganglioside	Y	non-small cell lung cancer
Radretumab		mab	human	fibronectin extra domain-B		cancer
Rafivirumab		mab	human	rabies virus glycoprotein		rabies (prophylaxis)
Ralpancizumab		mab	humanized	PCSK9		dyslipidemia
Ramucirumab	Cyramza	mab	human	VEGFR2	Y	solid tumors
Ranevetmab		mab	veterinary	nerve growth factor (NGF)		osteoarthritis in dogs
Ranibizumab	Lucentis	Fab	humanized	VEGF-A	Y	macular degeneration (wet form)
Raxibacumab		mab	human	anthrax toxin, protective antigen	Y	anthrax (prophylaxis and treatment)
Ravagalimab		mab	humanized	CD40		Crohn's disease
Ravulizumab	Ultomiris	mab	humanized	Complement component 5	Y	paroxysmal nocturnal hemoglobinuria, atypical hemolytic uremic syndrome, generalized myasthenia gravis, neuromyelitis optica spectrum disorder
Refanezumab		mab	humanized	myelin-associated glycoprotein		recovery of motor function after stroke
Regavirumab		mab	human	cytomegalovirus glycoprotein B		cytomegalovirus infection
Regdanvimab	Regkirona	mab	human	spike protein receptor binding domain (RBD) of SARS-CoV-2	Y	COVID-19
Relatlimab		mab	human	LAG3		melanoma
Relfovetmab	Portela	mab	veterinary	nerve growth factor (NGF)	Y	pain associated with osteoarthritis in cats
Remtolumab		mab	human	IL-17A, TNF		
Reslizumab	Cinqair	mab	humanized	IL-5	Y	inflammations of the airways, skin and gastrointestinal tract
Retifanlimab	Zynyz	mab	humanized	PD-1	Y	Merkel cell carcinoma
Rilotumumab		mab	human	hepatocyte growth factor (HGF)		solid tumors
Rinucumab		mab	human	PDGFRB		neovascular age-related macular degeneration
Risankizumab	Skyrizi	mab	humanized	IL-23A	Y	Crohn's disease, psoriasis, psoriatic arthritis, and asthma
Rituximab	MabThera, Rituxan	mab	chimeric	CD20	Y	lymphomas, leukemias, some autoimmune disorders
Rivabazumab pegol		mab	humanized	Pseudomonas aeruginosa type III secretion system		
Robatumumab		mab	human	IGF-1 receptor (CD221)		cancer
Rmab	RabiShield		human	rabies virus G glycoprotein	Y	post-exposure prophylaxis of rabies
Roledumab		mab	human	RHD (gene) (RHD)		Rh disease
Romilkimab		mab	chimeric/ humanized	IL-13		
Romosozumab	Evenity	mab	humanized	sclerostin	Y	osteoporosis
Rontalizumab		mab	humanized	IFN-α		systemic lupus erythematosus
Rosmantuzumab		mab	humanized	root plate-specific spondin 3		cancer
Rovalpituzumab tesirine		mab	humanized	DLL3		small cell lung cancer
Rovelizumab	LeukArrest	mab	humanized	CD11, CD18	Y	haemorrhagic shock etc.
Rozanolixizumab	Rystiggo	mab	chimeric/ humanized	FCGRT	Y	myasthenia gravis
Ruplizumab	Antova	mab	humanized	CD154 (CD40L)	Y	rheumatic diseases
SA237			humanized	IL-6 receptor		neuromyelitis optica and neuromyelitis optica spectrum disorders
Sacituzumab govitecan	Trodelvy	mab	humanized	TROP-2	Y	triple-negative breast cancer
Samalizumab		mab	humanized	CD200		cancer
Samrotamab vedotin		mab	chimeric/ humanized	LRRC15		cancer
Sarilumab	Kevzara	mab	human	IL-6	Y	rheumatoid arthritis, ankylosing spondylitis
Satralizumab	Enspryng	mab	humanized	IL-6 receptor	Y	neuromyelitis optica
Satumomab pendetide		mab	mouse	TAG-72		cancer (diagnosis)
Secukinumab	Cosentyx	mab	human	IL-17A	Y	uveitis, rheumatoid arthritis psoriasis
Selicrelumab		mab	human	CD40		
Seribantumab		mab	human	ERBB3 (HER3)		cancer
Setoxaximab		mab	chimeric	E. coli shiga toxin type-2		
Setrusumab		mab	human	sclerostin (SOST)		
Sevirumab			human	cytomegalovirus		cytomegalovirus infection
Sibrotuzumab		mab	humanized	FAP (gene) (FAP)		cancer
SGN-CD19A		mab	humanized	CD19		acute lymphoblastic leukemia and B-cell non-Hodgkin lymphoma
SHP647			human	mucosal addressin cell adhesion molecule		Crohn's disease
Sibeprenlimab	Voyxact	mab	humanized	A proliferation-inducing ligand	Y	immunoglobulin A nephropathy
Sifalimumab		mab	human	IFN-α		systemic lupus erythematosus (SLE), dermatomyositis, polymyositis
Siltuximab	Sylvant	mab	chimeric	IL-6	Y	cancer
Simtuzumab		mab	humanized	LOXL2		fibrosis
Sipavibart	Kavigale	mab	human	spike protein receptor binding domain (RBD) of SARS-CoV-2	Y	COVID-19
Siplizumab		mab	humanized	CD2		psoriasis, graft-versus-host disease (prevention)
Sirtratumab vedotin		mab	human	SLITRK6		cancer
Sirukumab		mab	human	IL-6		rheumatoid arthritis
Sofituzumab vedotin		mab	humanized	CA-125		ovarian cancer
Solanezumab		mab	humanized	β-amyloid		Alzheimer's disease
Solitomab		BiTE	mouse	EpCAM		gastrointestinal, lung, and other cancers
Sonepcizumab			humanized	sphingosine-1-phosphate		choroidal and retinal neovascularization
Sontuzumab		mab	humanized	episialin		
Sotrovimab	Xevudy	mab	human	spike protein receptor binding domain (RBD) of SARS-CoV-2	Y	COVID-19
Spartalizumab		mab	humanized	PD-1		melanoma
Spesolimab	Spevigo	mab	humanized	Interleukin 36 receptor (IL1RL2/IL1RAP)	Y	generalized pustular psoriasis (GPP)
Stamulumab		mab	human	myostatin		muscular dystrophy
Sugemalimab		mab	human	PD-1		non-small-cell lung cancer
Sulesomab	LeukoScan	Fab'	mouse	NCA-90 (granulocyte antigen)		osteomyelitis (imaging)
Suptavumab		mab	human	RSVFR		medically attended lower respiratory disease
Sutimlimab	Enjaymo	mab	chimeric/ humanized	complement component 1s (C1s)	Y	cold agglutinin disease
Suvizumab		mab	humanized	HIV-1		viral infections
Suvratoxumab		mab	human	Staphylococcus aureus alpha toxin		nosocomial pneumonia
Tabalumab		mab	human	B-cell activating factor (BAFF)		B-cell cancers
Tacatuzumab tetraxetan	AFP-Cide	mab	humanized	alpha-fetoprotein		cancer
Tadocizumab		Fab	humanized	integrin α_{IIb}β_{3}		percutaneous coronary intervention
Tafasitamab	Monjuvi	mab	humanized (from mouse)	CD19	Y	relapsed or refractory diffuse large B-cell lymphoma
Talacotuzumab		mab	humanized	CD123		leukemia etc.
Talizumab		mab	humanized	IgE		allergic reaction
Talquetamab	Talvey	BsAb	humanized	GPRC5D, CD3	Y	relapsed or refractory multiple myeloma
Tamtuvetmab	Tactress	mab	veterinary	CD52		
Tanezumab		mab	humanized	nerve growth factor (NGF)		pain
Taplitumomab paptox		mab	mouse	CD19		cancer
Tarextumab		mab	human	Notch receptor		cancer
Tarlatamab	Imdelltra	BsAb	human	DLL3, CD3	Y	small cell lung cancer
Tavolimab		mab	chimeric/ humanized	CD134		cancer
Teclistamab	Tecvayli	BsAb	human	B-cell maturation antigen (BCMA), CD3	Y	relapsed or refractory multiple myeloma
Tefibazumab	Aurexis	mab	humanized	clumping factor A		Staphylococcus aureus infection
Telimomab aritox		Fab	mouse			
Telisotuzumab		mab	humanized	HGFR		cancer
Telisotuzumab vedotin	Emrelis	mab	humanized	HGFR		cancer
Tenatumomab		mab	mouse	tenascin C		cancer
Teneliximab		mab	chimeric	CD40		autoimmune diseases and prevention of organ transplant rejection
Teplizumab	Tzield	mab	humanized	CD3	Y	diabetes mellitus type 1
Tepoditamab		mab	human	dendritic cell-associated lectin 2		cancer
Teprotumumab	Tepezza	mab	human	IGF-1 receptor (CD221)	Y	thyroid eye disease
Tesidolumab		mab	human	C5		
Tetulomab		mab	humanized	CD37		cancer
Tezepelumab	Tezspire	mab	human	thymic stromal lymphopoietin (TSLP)	Y	asthma
TGN1412			humanized	CD28		chronic lymphocytic leukemia, rheumatoid arthritis
Tibulizumab		mab	humanized	B-cell activating factor (BAFF)		autoimmune disorders
Tildrakizumab	Ilumya	mab	humanized	IL-23	Y	immunologically mediated inflammatory disorders
Tigatuzumab		mab	humanized	TRAIL-R2		cancer
Timigutuzumab		mab	humanized	HER2		cancer
Timolumab		mab	human	AOC3		
tiragolumab		mab	human			
Tiragotumab		mab	human	TIGIT		cancer
Tislelizumab		mab	humanized	PCDC1, CD279		non-small cell lung cancer
Tisotumab vedotin	Tivdak	mab	human	coagulation factor III	Y	relapsed or refractory cervical cancer
Tixagevimab		mab	human	spike protein receptor binding domain (RBD) of SARS-CoV-2	US emergency use authorization (EUA) when used with cilgavimab	COVID-19
TNX-650			humanized	IL-13		Hodgkin's lymphoma
Tocilizumab	Actemra, RoActemra	mab	humanized	IL-6 receptor	Y	rheumatoid arthritis
Tomuzotuximab		mab	humanized	Epidermal growth factor receptor (EGFR), HER1		cancer
Toralizumab		mab	humanized	CD154 (CD40L)		rheumatoid arthritis, lupus nephritis etc.
Tosatoxumab		mab	human	Staphylococcus aureus		
Tositumomab	Bexxar		mouse	CD20	Y	follicular lymphoma
Tovetumab		mab	human	PDGFRA		cancer
Tralokinumab	Adtralza, Adbry	mab	human	IL-13	Y	atopic dermatitis
Trastuzumab	Herceptin	mab	humanized	HER2/neu	Y	breast cancer
Trastuzumab duocarmazine	Kadcyla	mab	humanized	HER2/neu	Y	breast cancer
Trastuzumab emtansine	Kadcyla	mab	humanized	HER2/neu	Y	breast cancer
Trastuzumab envedotin		mab				
TRBS07	Ektomab	3funct		GD2 ganglioside		melanoma
Tregalizumab		mab	humanized	CD4		
Tremelimumab	Imjudo	mab	human	CTLA-4	Y	hepatocellular carcinoma
Trevogrumab		mab	human	growth differentiation factor 8		muscle atrophy due to orthopedic disuse and sarcopenia
Tucotuzumab celmoleukin		mab	humanized	EpCAM		cancer
Tuvirumab			human	hepatitis B virus		chronic hepatitis B
Ublituximab	Briumvi	mab	chimeric	CD20	Y	multiple sclerosis, chronic lymphocytic leukemia
Ulocuplumab		mab	human	CXCR4 (CD184)		hematologic malignancies
Urelumab		mab	human	4-1BB (CD137)		cancer etc.
Urtoxazumab		mab	humanized	Escherichia coli		diarrhoea caused by E. coli
Ustekinumab	Stelara	mab	human	IL-12, IL-23	Y	multiple sclerosis, psoriasis, psoriatic arthritis, Crohn's Disease
Utomilumab		mab	human	4-1BB (CD137)		diffuse large B-cell lymphoma
Vadastuximab talirine		mab	chimeric	CD33		Acute myeloid leukemia
Vanalimab		mab	humanized	CD40		
Vandortuzumab vedotin		mab	humanized	STEAP1		cancer
Vantictumab		mab	human	Frizzled receptor		cancer
Vanucizumab		mab	humanized	angiopoietin 2		cancer
Vapaliximab		mab	chimeric	AOC3 (VAP-1)		
Varisacumab		mab	human	VEGF-A		angiogenesis
Varlilumab		mab	human	CD27		solid tumors and hematologic malignancies
Vatelizumab		mab	humanized	ITGA2 (CD49b)		
Vedolizumab	Entyvio	mab	humanized	integrin α_{4} β_{7}	Y	Crohn's disease, ulcerative colitis
Veltuzumab		mab	humanized	CD20		non-Hodgkin's lymphoma
Vepalimomab		mab	mouse	AOC3 (VAP-1)		inflammation
Vesencumab		mab	human	NRP1		solid malignancies
Vilobelimab	Gohibic	mab	chimeric	C5a receptor (C5a)	Y (EU), and US emergency use authorization (EUA)	COVID-19
Visilizumab	Nuvion	mab	humanized	CD3		Crohn's disease, ulcerative colitis
Vobarilizumab		scFv	humanized	IL-6 receptor		inflammatory autoimmune diseases
Volociximab		mab	chimeric	integrin α_{5}β_{1}		solid tumors
Vonlerolizumab		mab	humanized	CD134		cancer
Vopratelimab		mab	humanized	CD278, aka ICOS		
Vorsetuzumab mafodotin		mab	humanized	CD70		cancer
Votumumab	HumaSPECT	mab	human	tumor antigen CTAA16.88		colorectal tumors
Vunakizumab		mab	humanized	IL-17A		
Xentuzumab		mab	humanized	IGF-1, IGF-2		?
XMAB-5574			humanized	CD19		diffuse large B-cell lymphoma
Zalutumumab		mab	human	Epidermal growth factor receptor (EGFR)		squamous cell carcinoma of the head and neck
Zanidatamab	Ziihera	BsAb	humanized	HER2, HER2	Y	biliary tract cancer
Zanolimumab		mab	human	CD4		rheumatoid arthritis, psoriasis, T-cell lymphoma
Zatuximab		mab	chimeric	HER1		cancer
Zenocutuzumab	Bizengri	BsAb	humanized	HER2, ERBB3 (HER3)	Y	cancer
Ziralimumab		mab	human	CD147 (basigin)		
Zolbetuximab	Vyloy	mab	chimeric	Claudin 18 Isoform 2	Y	gastric cancer
Zolimomab aritox		mab	mouse	CD5		systemic lupus erythematosus, graft-versus-host disease
