= Myostatin inhibitor =

Class of drugs

Myostatin inhibitors are a class of drugs that work by blocking the effect of myostatin, which inhibits muscle growth. In animal models and limited human studies, myostatin inhibitors have increased muscle size. They are being developed to treat obesity, sarcopenia, muscular dystrophy, and other illnesses.

== Background ==
Myostatin, a member of the transforming growth factor superfamily, is a negative regulator of bone and muscle growth. It may also play a role in obesity, insulin resistance, cardiovascular disease, and chronic kidney disease.

== Mechanisms ==
Follistatin is an endogenous protein that negatively regulates myostatin.

Reduction of myostatin expression is one of the mechanisms for the effects of androgens in promoting muscle growth. Androgens both regulate myostatin expression directly and upregulate follistatin expression. YK-11, a selective androgen receptor modulator, is also a myostatin inhibitor.

Resistance training reduces myostatin activity and increases follistatin activity. Pharmacological myostatin inhibitors can therefore be considered exercise mimetics. Creatine, a popular workout supplement, has shown some myostatin inhibitory effects in preclinical studies.

Many drugs in development as myostatin inhibitors also reduce the activity of related proteins such as GDF11, activins, and bone morphogenetic proteins. While this off target activity can increase their effectiveness in promoting anabolism, it also increases the risk of adverse effects.

Monoclonal antibodies have been developed that disable myostatin, including apitegromab, domagrozumab, landogrozumab, and stamulumab. Another form of myostatin inhibition is gene therapy.

Another monoclonal antibody, bimagrumab, works as an antagonist of the ACVR2 and ACVR2B receptors, preventing myostatin and activin A from binding. Because activin A reduces erythropoiesis, targeting the ACVR receptors and inhibiting activin A activity can increase the risk of venous thromboembolism in patients who are not anemic.

== Clinical trials ==
Clinical trials for muscular dystrophy have not proven successful in generating functional improvements compared to placebo. Gains of muscle mass were small to non-existent in this population. Research is ongoing on the potential use of myostatin inhibitors for motor neuron diseases like spinal muscle atrophy and amyotrophic lateral sclerosis. Due to myostatin's effect as a negative regulator of bone, its inhibition has also been considered for orthopedic diseases such as rheumatoid arthritis.

Myostatin inhibitors were generally able to increase lean body mass and reduce body fat in people with sarcopenia, but the extent to which this translated into functional improvements varied.

Bimagrumab showed effectiveness in increasing lean mass and reducing fat mass in obese individuals in a clinical trial.

== Performance enhancing drug ==
It is hypothesized that myostatin inhibitors have an ergogenic effect due to promoting muscle growth. Myostatin inhibitors are banned by the World Anti-Doping Agency.
