= Radioimmunotherapy =

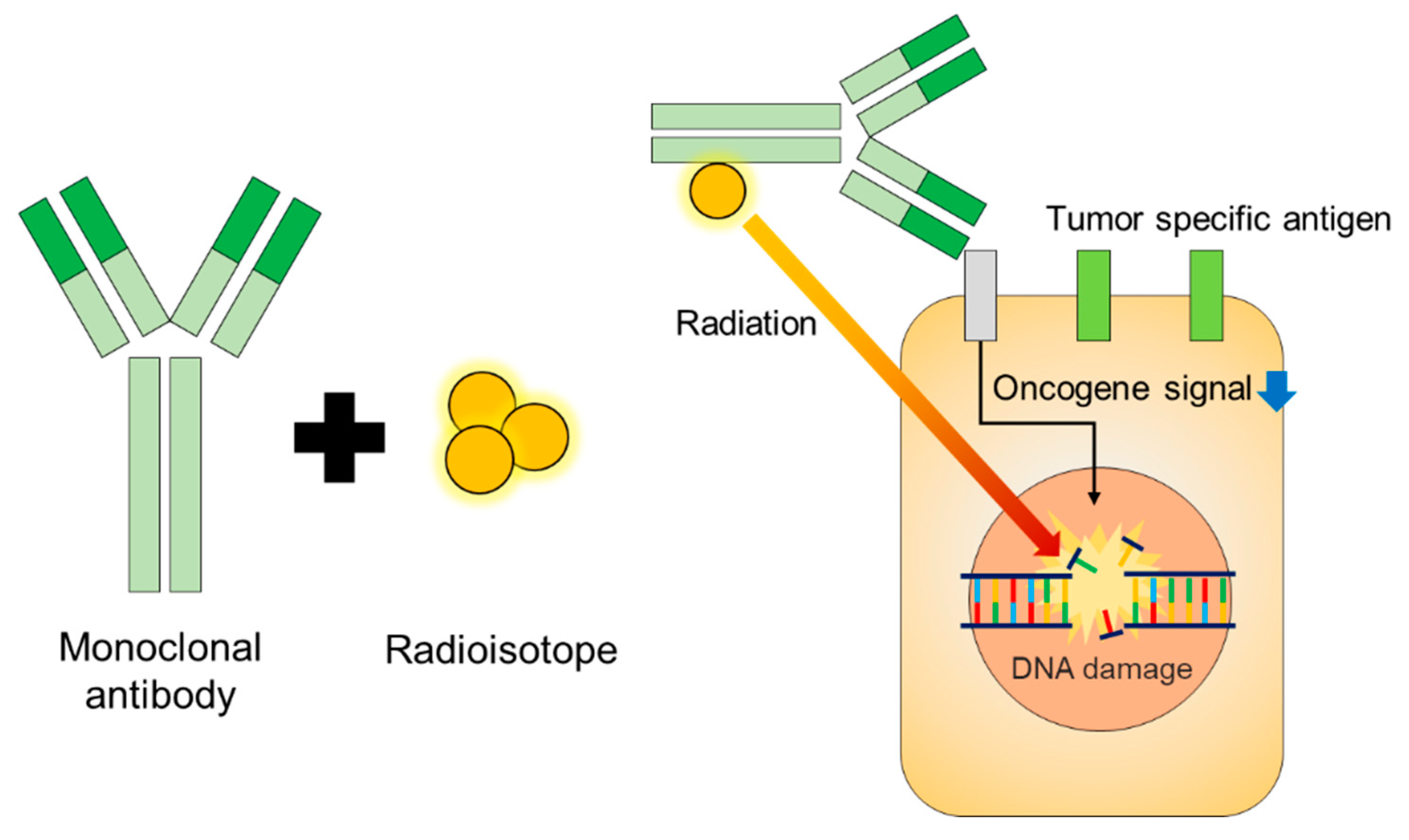
- Schematic of radioimmunotherapy (RIT)
- Other names: RIT
- ICD-9-CM: 92.28
- MeSH: D016499

Radioimmunotherapy (RIT) uses an antibody labeled with a radionuclide to deliver cytotoxic radiation to a target cell. It is a form of unsealed source radiotherapy. In cancer therapy, an antibody with specificity for a tumor-associated antigen is used to deliver a lethal dose of radiation to the tumor cells. The ability for the antibody to specifically bind to a tumor-associated antigen increases the dose delivered to the tumor cells while decreasing the dose to normal tissues. By its nature, RIT requires a tumor cell to express an antigen that is unique to the neoplasm or is not accessible in normal cells.

== History of available agents ==
Name	Description	FDA status	EMA status
Ibritumomab tiuxetan (Zevalin)	monoclonal antibody anti-CD20 conjugated to a molecule that chelates Yttrium-90.	Approved (2002)	Authorised (2004)
Iodine (^{131}I) tositumomab (Bexxar)	links a molecule containing Iodine-131 to an anti-CD20 monoclonal antibody	Approved (2003); Withdrawn (2014)	Orphan drug (2003); Withdrawn (2015)
Lutetium (^{177}Lu) lilotomab satetraxetan (Betalutin)	combination of lutetium-177 and an anti-CD37 monoclonal antibody	Fast track (2020)	Orphan drug (2020)

^{131}I tositumomab and ^{90}Y ibritumomab tiuxetan were the first agents of radioimmunotherapy, and they were approved for the treatment of refractory non-Hodgkin's lymphoma. This means they are used in patients whose lymphoma is refractory to conventional chemotherapy and the monoclonal antibody rituximab.

=== Agents in clinical development ===
A set of radioimmunotherapy drugs that rely upon an alpha-emitting isotope (e.g., bismuth-213 or, preferably, actinium-225), rather than a beta emitter, as the killing source of radiation is being developed. Several phase II clinical trials for the treatment of acute myeloid leukemia have been carried out using alpha-emitting RITs.

^{90}Y-FF-21101 is a monoclonal antibody against P-cadherin radiolabeled with yttrium-90. It is one of several RIT treatments under investigation intending to treat solid tumors. A phase I clinical trial began in 2015.

== Other applications (non-approved indications) ==
Other types of cancer for which RIT has therapeutic potential include prostate cancer, metastatic melanoma, ovarian cancer, neoplastic meningitis, leukemia, high-grade brain glioma, and metastatic colorectal cancer.

Components of the extracellular matrix and the tumor microenvironment can also be targeted by radioimmunotherapy, such as Netrin-1 (an axon guidance protein) and FAP (a marker for cancer associated fibroblasts).
