= C2115H3252N556O673S16 =

The molecular formula C_{2115}H_{3252}N_{556}O_{673}S_{16} (molar mass: 47,750 g/mol) may refer to:

- Certolizumab pegol
- Lumiliximab
