= Narnatumab =

Monoclonal antibody

Monoclonal antibody
- Type: Whole antibody
- Source: Mouse
- Target: MST1R (aka RON)

Clinical data
- ATC code: none

Identifiers
- CAS Number: 1188275-92-4
- ChemSpider: none
- UNII: R42YK40U9M
- KEGG: D10074

Chemical and physical data
- Formula: C_{6454}H_{10026}N_{1754}O_{2020}S_{44}
- Molar mass: 145922.10 g·mol^{−1}

Narnatumab is a human monoclonal antibody designed for the treatment of cancer. Clinical development was abandoned after phase I trials.

Narnatumab was developed by ImClone Systems.
