= Lilotomab =

Murine monoclonal antibody against CD37

Monoclonal antibody
- Type: Whole antibody
- Source: Mouse
- Target: CD37

Clinical data
- Other names: Tetulomab, HH1
- ATC code: none

Identifiers
- CAS Number: 1453362-55-4 1453362-90-7 (lutetium (^{177}Lu) lilotomab satetraxetan)
- ChemSpider: none
- UNII: 58I6YNR7BV
- KEGG: D12125

Lilotomab (formerly tetulomab, HH1) is a murine monoclonal antibody against CD37, a glycoprotein which is expressed on the surface of mature human B cells. It was generated at the Norwegian Radium Hospital.

As of 2016 it was under development by the Norwegian company Nordic Nanovector ASA as a radioimmunotherapeutic in which lilotomab is conjugated to the beta radiation-emitting isotope lutetium-177 by means of a linker called satetraxetan, a derivative of DOTA. This compound is called ^{177}Lu-HH1 or lutetium (^{177}Lu) lilotomab satetraxetan (trade name Betalutin). As of 2016, a phase 1/2 clinical trial in people with non-Hodgkin lymphoma was underway.

The satetraxetan structure chelating lutetium-177
