= Oportuzumab monatox =

Pharmaceutical drug

Monoclonal antibody
- Type: Single-chain variable fragment
- Source: Humanized
- Target: EpCAM

Clinical data
- Other names: oportuzumab monatox-qqrs
- ATC code: L01FX16 (WHO)

Identifiers
- CAS Number: 945228-48-8
- DrugBank: DB05319
- ChemSpider: none
- UNII: 945CY7ZMI2
- KEGG: D11913

Chemical and physical data
- Formula: C_{3072}H_{4723}N_{877}O_{952}S_{12}
- Molar mass: 69558.48 g·mol^{−1}

Oportuzumab monatox is an experimental anti-cancer medication. Chemically, oportuzumab is a single chain variable fragment of a monoclonal antibody which binds to epithelial cell adhesion molecule (EpCAM, the tumor-associated calcium signal transducer 1). Oportuzumab is fused with Pseudomonas aeruginosa exotoxin A (which is reflected by the monatox in the medication's name).

The drug was developed by Canadian-based Viventia Bio Inc. The company was acquired by Cambridge(MA)-based Eleven Biotherapeutics in 2016, which then changed its name to Sesen Bio. In 2019 Sesen Bio reported updated, preliminary primary and secondary endpoint data from the company's Phase 3 VISTA trial further supporting the strong benefit-risk profile of Vicineum for the potential treatment of patients with high-risk, bacillus Calmette-Guérin(BCG) unresponsive, non-muscle invasive bladder cancer (NMIBC). The Company applied for approval of Vicineum by the United States Food and Drug Administration and the European Medicines Agency.
