= Enoticumab =

Monoclonal antibody

Monoclonal antibody
- Type: Whole antibody
- Source: Human
- Target: DLL4

Clinical data
- Other names: REGN421
- ATC code: none

Identifiers
- CAS Number: 1192578-27-0
- ChemSpider: none
- UNII: B59DCD0F7D
- KEGG: D10460

Enoticumab (REGN421, INN) is a human monoclonal antibody that binds to DLL4. It acts as an immunomodulator.
