= Flotetuzumab =

Monoclonal antibody

Monoclonal antibody
- Type: Di-single-chain variable fragment
- Source: Humanized (from mouse)
- Target: CD3, CD123

Clinical data
- Other names: MGD006
- ATC code: none

Identifiers
- CAS Number: 1664355-28-5
- ChemSpider: none
- UNII: 0AHT0IC02G
- KEGG: D11306

Chemical and physical data
- Formula: C_{2618}H_{4040}N_{704}O_{813}S_{16}
- Molar mass: 58898.19 g·mol^{−1}

Flotetuzumab (INN; development code MGD006) is a bispecific antibody designed for the treatment of acute myeloid leukemia.

This drug is being developed by MacroGenics, Inc.
