= Vobarilizumab =

Monoclonal antibody

Monoclonal antibody
- Type: Single-chain variable fragment
- Source: Humanized
- Target: IL6R

Clinical data
- Other names: ALX0061
- ATC code: none

Identifiers
- CAS Number: 1628814-88-9
- ChemSpider: none
- UNII: 9OD8ISS64U
- KEGG: D11005

Chemical and physical data
- Formula: C_{1118}H_{1757}N_{315}O_{364}S_{8}
- Molar mass: 25691.68 g·mol^{−1}

Vobarilizumab (INN; development code ALX0061) is a humanized bispecific nanobody (Llama-derived heavy-chain only (Vhh) antibody) designed for the treatment of inflammatory autoimmune diseases.

== Origin ==
This drug was developed by Ablynx NV to block interleukin-6 receptor. Vobarilizumab has been evaluated in patients with rheumatoid arthritis as well as in lupus.
