= Vandortuzumab vedotin =

Monoclonal antibody

Monoclonal antibody
- Type: Whole antibody
- Source: Humanized (from mouse)
- Target: STEAP1

Clinical data
- Other names: RG7450
- ATC code: none

Identifiers
- CAS Number: 1471985-92-8
- ChemSpider: none
- UNII: 44OUQ00D1U
- KEGG: D11002

Chemical and physical data
- Formula: C_{6608}H_{10168}N_{1756}O_{2076}S_{44}
- Molar mass: 148838.89 g·mol^{−1}

Vandortuzumab vedotin (INN; development code RG7450) is a humanized monoclonal antibody designed for the treatment of cancer.

This drug was developed by Genentech/Roche. Development was discontinued in 2017.
