= Duvortuxizumab =

Monoclonal antibody

Monoclonal antibody
- Type: Single-chain variable fragment
- Source: Chimeric/humanized hybrid (mouse/human)
- Target: CD19

Clinical data
- ATC code: none

Identifiers
- CAS Number: 1831098-91-9
- ChemSpider: none
- UNII: J545GSE96Y
- KEGG: D11372

Chemical and physical data
- Formula: C_{4850}H_{7485}N_{1305}O_{1487}S_{35}
- Molar mass: 108989.98 g·mol^{−1}

Duvortuxizumab (INN) is a chimeric/humanized monoclonal antibody designed for the treatment of B-cell malignancies.

This drug was developed by Janssen Global Services.
