= Solitomab =

Monoclonal antibody
- Type: Bi-specific T-cell engager
- Source: Mouse
- Target: EpCAM

Clinical data
- ATC code: none

Identifiers
- CAS Number: 1005198-65-1
- ChemSpider: none
- UNII: ZQQ51B5708

Solitomab (INN; development code MT110) is an artificial bispecific monoclonal antibody that is being investigated as an anti-cancer drug. It is a fusion protein consisting of two single-chain variable fragments (scFvs) of different antibodies on a single peptide chain of about 55 kilodaltons. One of the scFvs binds to T cells via the CD3 receptor, and the other to EpCAM as a tumor antigen against gastrointestinal, lung, and other cancers.

== Mechanism of action ==
A BiTE linking a T cell to a tumor cell.

Like other bispecific antibodies, and unlike ordinary monoclonal antibodies, solitumab forms a link between T cells and its target tumor cell antigen. This causes T cells to exert cytotoxic activity on tumor cells by producing proteins like perforin and granzymes, independently of the presence of MHC I or co-stimulatory molecules. These proteins enter tumor cells and initiate the cell's apoptosis. This action mimics physiological processes observed during T cell attacks against tumor cells.
