= Letolizumab =

Monoclonal antibody

Monoclonal antibody
- Type: Single-chain variable fragment
- Source: Humanized (from mouse)
- Target: tumor necrosis factor-related activation protein

Clinical data
- Other names: BMS-986004
- ATC code: none

Identifiers
- CAS Number: 1450981-87-9
- ChemSpider: none
- UNII: 449MIE2SD6
- KEGG: D11122

Chemical and physical data
- Formula: C_{1734}H_{2688}N_{466}O_{538}S_{10}
- Molar mass: 38991.90 g·mol^{−1}

Letolizumab (INN; development code BMS-986004) is a humanized monoclonal antibody designed for the treatment of inflammatory diseases.

This drug was developed by Bristol-Myers Squibb.
