= Otlertuzumab =

Monoclonal antibody

Monoclonal antibody
- Type: ?
- Source: Humanized (from mouse)
- Target: CD37

Clinical data
- ATC code: none

Identifiers
- CAS Number: 1372645-37-8
- ChemSpider: none
- UNII: 2MZ3L2664T

Chemical and physical data
- Formula: C_{4660}H_{7136}N_{1246}O_{1452}S_{30}
- Molar mass: 104809.42 g·mol^{−1}

Otlertuzumab (TRU‐016) is a humanized monoclonal antibody that targets CD37 designed for the treatment of cancer.

This drug was developed by Emergent BioSolutions and has been in clinical trials for lymphoma and Chronic Lymphocytic Leukemia (CLL)
