= MDX-1097 =

Monoclonal antibody

KappaMab
Monoclonal antibody
- Type: ?

Clinical data
- Other names: IST-1097; KappaMab; MDX-1097

Identifiers
- CAS Number: 1793022-75-9

MDX-1097 (formerly called IST-1097, now called KappaMab) is a monoclonal antibody therapy being developed by the Australian biotechnology company HaemaLogiX Ltd for the treatment of multiple myeloma. In 2023, results were reported from a Phase IIb trial (AMaRC 01-16) assessing KappaMab alone and in combination with lenalidomide and low-dose dexamethasone in relapsed or refractory kappa light chain-restricted multiple myeloma, a type of white blood cell cancer.

== Development ==
Originally, a mouse (murine) antibody was used for initial experiments. This murine monoclonal antibody, called K-1-21, was raised against purified human kappa Bence Jones proteins (BJP). K-1-21 was shown to be specific for a cell-surface antigen that was named kappa myeloma antigen (KMA). KMA was found on malignant B cells (plasma cells) isolated from the bone marrow of patients with kappa restricted multiple myeloma (kMM), lymphoma and Waldenström macroglobulinemia. KMA was also detected in cell culture on the surface of human myeloma cell lines derived from patients with kappa restricted myeloma (kHMCLs). The K-1-21 antibody was re-named mKap.

The next step was to produce an antibody for use in humans that was based on the murine version. The heavy and light chain variable region genes (VH and Vk) of MDX-1097 were isolated from mKap hybridoma cells using recombinant DNA methodologies. MDX-1097, a chimeric (murine plus human) monoclonal antibody, was manufactured according by Medarex Inc. (subsidiary of Bristol-Myers Squibb). MDX-1097 has retained the specificity and affinity observed for mKap. MDX-1097 has been used in the clinical trials described below, as well as in vitro studies.

== Pharmacology ==
=== Mechanism of action ===
KMA is a membrane-bound form of free kappa light chain on malignant B-cells, in-vitro activated B cells and rare tonsillar B-cells. KMA is not found on normal human leucocytes. KappaMab (MDX-1097) is specific for KMA and binds to a unique conformational epitope in the kappa constant region that is presented when kappa free light chain (kFLC) associates with sphingomyelin in the cell membrane. KappaMab does not bind to kappa immunoglobulin (Igκ) and it has a 5-fold higher affinity for membrane-bound KMA (IC_{50} 4nM) when compared to serum kappa Free Light Chain (IC_{50} 20nM). Moreover, in vitro studies demonstrated that KM induces selective antibody-dependent cellular cytotoxicity (ADCC) and antibody dependent cellular phagocytosis (ADCP) of kappa-positive MM cells and that lenalidomide (LEN) exposure upregulates KMA expression on MM cells promoting enhanced KM-induced NK-mediated ADCC.

== Clinical trials ==
In an initial Phase 1 clinical trial, MDX-1097 was administered intravenously to multiple myeloma patients with stable kappa-type disease, with doses ranging from 0.3 mg/kg to 10.0 mg/kg. The study primarily aimed to evaluate MDX-1097's safety profile across these dose levels.

In a Phase 2a clinical trial involving 19 patients with stable kappa-type multiple myeloma, MDX-1097 was administered at a dose of 10 mg/kg weekly for 8 doses to assess safety and efficacy.,

In a Phase 2b investigator-initiated clinical trial, repeated doses of KappaMab were administered either alone or in combination with lenalidomide and dexamethasone to patients with kappa-type relapsed, refractory multiple myeloma (MM). The study, conducted across multiple centers, aimed to assess safety and efficacy in both treatment cohorts.

In 2026, the Peter MacCallum Cancer Centre opened the KOALA trial (NCT07541391), a first-in-human Phase 1 study of KMCAR, a chimeric antigen receptor T-cell therapy directed at KMA that uses the binding domain of KappaMab. KMCAR is derived from HaemaLogiX's KappaMab antibody technology: T cells are genetically engineered so that the single-chain variable fragment (scFv) of KappaMab is expressed on the T-cell surface, fused to CD28 or 4-1BB co-stimulatory domains and a CD3ζ signalling domain. HaemaLogiX holds the patent covering KMA-directed chimeric antigen receptors, filed with a priority date of 2015. The study is a dose-escalation Phase 1 with an estimated enrolment of 12 patients with relapsed or refractory kappa light chain-restricted multiple myeloma at a single site in Melbourne, Australia, and was recruiting as of May 2026. Its primary outcomes are safety, determination of the maximum tolerated dose, and manufacturing feasibility; overall response rate is a secondary outcome. The KMCAR T-cell investigational product is designated PMCC-COE-KMA in the trial registration
