= Trevogrumab =

Monoclonal antibody

Monoclonal antibody
- Type: ?
- Source: Human
- Target: growth differentiation factor 8

Clinical data
- Other names: REGN1033
- ATC code: none

Identifiers
- CAS Number: 1429201-24-0
- ChemSpider: none
- UNII: 87T4327873
- KEGG: D11242

Chemical and physical data
- Formula: C_{6374}H_{9884}N_{1696}O_{2018}S_{46}
- Molar mass: 144037.80 g·mol^{−1}

Trevogrumab (INN; development code REGN1033) is a human monoclonal antibody designed for the treatment of muscle atrophy due to orthopedic disuse and sarcopenia. It is often used with Garetosmab.

Trevogrumab is a fully human monoclonal antibody that functions as a selective inhibitor of myostatin (GDF8), a key negative regulator of skeletal muscle growth and mass. By binding and neutralizing myostatin, Trevogrumab prevents its interaction with activin type 2 receptors (ActRIIA/B), thereby reducing myostatin-mediated signaling and allowing increased muscle growth and preservation.

This drug was developed by Regeneron Pharmaceuticals, Inc.
