= Depatuxizumab mafodotin =

Monoclonal antibody

Monoclonal antibody
- Type: Whole antibody
- Source: Chimeric/humanized hybrid (mouse/human)
- Target: EGFR

Clinical data
- Other names: ABT-414
- ATC code: none

Identifiers
- CAS Number: 1585973-65-4
- ChemSpider: none
- UNII: F3R7A4P04N
- KEGG: D11019

Chemical and physical data
- Formula: C_{6624}H_{10228}N_{1728}O_{2052}S_{42}
- Molar mass: 148251.25 g·mol^{−1}

Depatuxizumab mafodotin (INN; development code ABT-414) is an antibody-drug conjugate designed for the treatment of cancer. It is composed of an EGFR IGg1 monoclonal antibody (depatuxizumab) conjugated to the tubulin inhibitor monomethyl auristatin F via a stable maleimidocaproyl link.

This drug was developed by AbbVie. In May 2019 AbbVie stopped enrolment in all studies of Depatux-M after late-stage failure in newly diagnosed glioblastoma.

In 2014, Orphan Drug Status was granted by the FDA for glioblastoma multiforme. It is in phase II/III clinical trials for glioblastoma, in phase II clinical trials for non-small cell lung cancer, and in phase I clinical trials for the treatment of other solid tumors. Phase I results were presented at ASCO in 2016.
