= Pinatuzumab vedotin =

Monoclonal antibody

Monoclonal antibody
- Type: ?
- Source: Humanized (from mouse)
- Target: CD22

Clinical data
- Other names: DCDT2980S, FCU2703
- ATC code: none

Identifiers
- CAS Number: 1313706-14-7
- ChemSpider: none
- UNII: 6KA1906BLC

Chemical and physical data
- Formula: C_{6748}H_{10377}N_{1773}O_{2083}S_{44}
- Molar mass: 151081.21 g·mol^{−1}

Pinatuzumab vedotin (INN; development codes DCDT2980S and FCU2703) is a monoclonal antibody designed for the treatment of B-cell malignancies.

This drug was developed by Genentech/Roche.
