= Sofituzumab vedotin =

Pharmaceutical drug

Monoclonal antibody
- Type: ?
- Source: Humanized (from mouse)
- Target: carbohydrate antigen 125

Clinical data
- Other names: DMUC5754A
- ATC code: none

Identifiers
- CAS Number: 1418200-58-4
- ChemSpider: none
- UNII: 2X3CKG601L
- KEGG: D11241

Chemical and physical data
- Molar mass: 144.7 kg/mol

Sofituzumab vedotin (INN; development code DMUC5754A) is a monoclonal antibody designed for the treatment of ovarian cancer.

This drug was developed by Genentech/Roche.

Sofituzumab vedotin is an antibody-drug conjugate that targets MUC16, a protein that is overexpressed in several types of cancer including ovarian and pancreatic cancer. The conjugate consists of a human anti-nectin-4 antibody linked to the cytotoxic agent MMAE, which is released after internalization by the cancer cell. In addition to its direct cytotoxic effect, sofituzumab vedotin may also mediate antitumor activity through signal transduction inhibition, antibody-dependent cellular cytotoxicity, and complement-dependent cytotoxicity. Clinical trials have shown promising results in the treatment of ovarian and pancreatic cancer.
