= Elezanumab =

Monoclonal antibody

Monoclonal antibody
- Type: ?

Clinical data
- Other names: AE12-1Y-QL; ABT-555

Legal status
- Legal status: Investigational

Identifiers
- CAS Number: 1791416-49-3
- UNII: SK1LVT23A1

Elezanumab (development names AE12-1Y-QL and ABT-555) is a fully human monoclonal antibody developed by AbbVie against repulsive guidance molecule A (RGMa). It has been tested in people with multiple sclerosis and acute ischemic stroke.
