= Tovetumab =

Monoclonal antibody

Monoclonal antibody
- Type: ?
- Source: Human
- Target: PDGFRA

Clinical data
- ATC code: none

Identifiers
- CAS Number: 1243266-04-7
- ChemSpider: none
- UNII: 2XY62K75UV
- KEGG: D10411

Chemical and physical data
- Formula: C_{6400}H_{9906}N_{1726}O_{2002}S_{54}
- Molar mass: 144792.97 g·mol^{−1}

Tovetumab is an anti-PDGFRa monoclonal antibody designed for the treatment of cancer. It was developed by MedImmune, and trialed for use in glioblastoma and non-small cell lung cancer. Development was discontinued in 2013.

This drug was developed by MedImmune, LLC.
