= Abrilumab =

Monoclonal antibody

Monoclonal antibody
- Type: ?
- Source: Human
- Target: integrin alpha-4 beta-7

Clinical data
- Other names: AMG 181
- ATC code: none

Identifiers
- CAS Number: 1342290-43-0
- ChemSpider: none
- UNII: Y9UQ37XT2T
- KEGG: D10540

Chemical and physical data
- Formula: C_{6362}H_{9806}N_{1686}O_{2014}S_{52}
- Molar mass: 143803.34 g·mol^{−1}

Abrilumab (INN; development code AMG 181) is a monoclonal antibody designed for the treatment of inflammatory bowel disease, ulcerative colitis, and Crohn's disease.

This drug was developed by MedImmune.
