= Seribantumab =

Monoclonal antibody

Monoclonal antibody
- Type: ?
- Source: Human
- Target: HER3

Clinical data
- Other names: MM-121
- ATC code: none

Identifiers
- CAS Number: 1334296-12-6
- IUPHAR/BPS: 8297
- ChemSpider: none
- UNII: 1N3L70MDFX
- KEGG: D11777

Chemical and physical data
- Formula: C_{6340}H_{9810}N_{1690}O_{1986}S_{52}
- Molar mass: 143151.18 g·mol^{−1}

Seribantumab (INN; development code MM-121) is a monoclonal antibody designed for the treatment of cancer. It binds to extracellular domain of HER3 blocking NRG1 binding and thereby preventing the activation of the receptor.

This drug was developed by Sanofi/Merrimack Pharmaceuticals, Inc.
