= Dapirolizumab pegol =

Pharmaceutical drug

Monoclonal antibody
- Type: ?
- Target: CD40 ligand

Identifiers
- CAS Number: 1416147-64-2
- DrugBank: DB16131
- UNII: N4606MB5HM

Dapirolizumab pegol is "a polyethylene glycol conjugated anti-CD40L Fab fragment" developed by Biogen and UCB for systemic lupus erythematosus.
