= Lumretuzumab =

Monoclonal antibody

Monoclonal antibody
- Type: Whole antibody
- Source: Humanized (from mouse)
- Target: ERBB3

Clinical data
- Other names: RG7116
- ATC code: none

Identifiers
- CAS Number: 1448327-63-6
- ChemSpider: none
- UNII: Y6M3205516
- KEGG: D11239

Chemical and physical data
- Formula: C_{6512}H_{10064}N_{1736}O_{2052}S_{44}
- Molar mass: 146916.88 g·mol^{−1}

Lumretuzumab (INN; development code RG7116) is a humanized monoclonal antibody designed for the treatment of cancer.

This drug was developed by Genentech/Roche.
