= Refanezumab =

Monoclonal antibody

Monoclonal antibody
- Type: ?
- Source: Humanized (from mouse)
- Target: myelin-associated glycoprotein

Clinical data
- Other names: GSK249320
- ATC code: none

Identifiers
- CAS Number: 1233953-61-1
- ChemSpider: none
- UNII: 3ZZ278643V

Chemical and physical data
- Formula: C_{6608}H_{10156}N_{1732}O_{2064}S_{44}
- Molar mass: 148298.64 g·mol^{−1}

Refanezumab (GSK249320) is a monoclonal antibody designed for the recovery of motor function after stroke.

This drug was developed by GlaxoSmithKline.
