= Plozalizumab =

Monoclonal antibody

Monoclonal antibody
- Type: Whole antibody
- Source: Humanized (from mouse)
- Target: CCR2

Clinical data
- Other names: hu1D9
- ATC code: none

Identifiers
- CAS Number: 1610761-46-0
- ChemSpider: none
- UNII: 4XG66BMN0D
- KEGG: D10972

Chemical and physical data
- Formula: C_{6490}H_{10052}N_{1736}O_{2018}S_{42}
- Molar mass: 146032.46 g·mol^{−1}

Plozalizumab (INN; hu1D9) is a humanized monoclonal antibody designed for the treatment of diabetic nephropathy and arteriovenous graft patency.

This drug was developed by Takeda Pharmaceuticals International Co.
