= Ficlatuzumab =

Monoclonal antibody

Monoclonal antibody
- Type: Whole antibody
- Source: Humanized (from mouse)
- Target: HGF

Clinical data
- ATC code: none

Identifiers
- CAS Number: 1174900-84-5
- ChemSpider: none
- UNII: 77E89833TG
- KEGG: D10123

Chemical and physical data
- Formula: C_{6446}H_{9954}N_{1718}O_{2026}S_{46}
- Molar mass: 145409.30 g·mol^{−1}

Ficlatuzumab is a humanized monoclonal antibody designed for the treatment of cancers.

It is a humanized monoclonal antibody that binds to hepatocyte growth factor, thus inhibiting the c-MET receptor signaling cascade.

Ficlatuzumab was developed by AVEO Pharmaceuticals. In May 2012, AVEO released results of a Phase II clinical trial comparing gefitinib alone and in combination with ficlatuzamab in treatment-naive Asian patients with non-small cell lung cancer.
