= Crotedumab =

Monoclonal antibody

Monoclonal antibody
- Type: Whole antibody
- Source: Human
- Target: GCGR

Clinical data
- Other names: REGN1193
- ATC code: none

Identifiers
- CAS Number: 1452387-69-7
- ChemSpider: none
- UNII: 4JQ68PW6XF
- KEGG: D11230

Chemical and physical data
- Formula: C_{6518}H_{10044}N_{1732}O_{2052}S_{46}
- Molar mass: 146976.88 g·mol^{−1}

Crotedumab (REGN1193) (INN) is a humanized monoclonal antibody designed for the treatment of diabetes.

This drug was developed by Regeneron Pharmaceuticals but is no longer under development.
