= Dusigitumab =

Chemical compound

Monoclonal antibody
- Type: Whole antibody
- Source: Human
- Target: IGF2

Clinical data
- ATC code: none

Identifiers
- CAS Number: 1204390-13-5
- IUPHAR/BPS: 7749
- ChemSpider: none
- UNII: 0Z70DT5PRX
- KEGG: D10352

Chemical and physical data
- Formula: C_{6372}H_{9824}N_{1700}O_{2016}S_{54}
- Molar mass: 144233.81 g·mol^{−1}

Dusigitumab is a human monoclonal antibody designed for the treatment of cancer. It binds to IGF2. It was developed by MedImmune, which was acquired by AstraZeneca, using Xenomouse technology licensed from Abgenix. Its development has been discontinued.
