= Ralpancizumab =

Monoclonal antibody

Monoclonal antibody
- Type: ?
- Source: Humanized (from mouse)
- Target: neural apoptosis-regulated proteinase 1

Clinical data
- Other names: RN317
- ATC code: none

Identifiers
- CAS Number: 1407495-04-8
- ChemSpider: none
- UNII: YB9L51E4MD

Chemical and physical data
- Formula: C_{6422}H_{9922}N_{1730}O_{2012}S_{54}
- Molar mass: 145289.36 g·mol^{−1}

Ralpancizumab (INN; development code RN317) is a monoclonal antibody designed for the treatment of dyslipidemia.

This drug was developed by Pfizer.
