= Gatipotuzumab =

Monoclonal antibody

Monoclonal antibody
- Type: Whole antibody
- Source: Humanized (from mouse)
- Target: tumor specific glycosylation of MUC1

Clinical data
- Other names: PankoMab-GEX, anti-TA-MUC1
- ATC code: None

Identifiers
- CAS Number: 1264737-26-9
- ChemSpider: none
- UNII: 85V55ZLV2Z

Gatipotuzumab is a humanized monoclonal antibody recognizing the tumor-specific epitope of mucin-1 (TA-MUC1), enabling it to differentiate between tumor MUC1 and non-tumor MUC1 epitopes. Gatipotuzumab is being developed by Glycotope GMBH and is undergoing a phase II clinical trial for ovarian cancer.
