= Vanucizumab =

Monoclonal antibody

Monoclonal antibody
- Type: Whole antibody
- Source: Humanized
- Target: angiopoietin 2

Clinical data
- Other names: RG7221
- ATC code: none

Identifiers
- CAS Number: 1448221-05-3
- ChemSpider: none
- UNII: B800Z06O8K
- KEGG: D11244

Chemical and physical data
- Formula: C_{6529}H_{10033}N_{1733}O_{2038}S_{46}
- Molar mass: 146887.94 g·mol^{−1}

Vanucizumab (INN; development code RG7221) is an experimental humanized monoclonal antibody designed for the treatment of cancer.

Vanucizumab is a bi-specific monoclonal antibody composed of two different heavy chains and two different light chains. One arm of the antibody binds Angiopoietin-2 (Ang2) and the other is based on bevacizumab (Avastin), binding Vascular Endothelial Growth Factor A (VEGF-A). The antibody is designed to inhibit both VEGF-A and Ang2 simultaneously to offer superior clinical benefit compared to VEGF-A inhibition alone.

This drug was developed by Genentech/Roche.
