= Suvratoxumab =

Monoclonal antibody

Monoclonal antibody
- Type: ?
- Source: Human
- Target: Staphylococcus aureus alpha toxin

Clinical data
- Other names: MEDI4893
- ATC code: none

Identifiers
- CAS Number: 1629620-18-3
- ChemSpider: none
- UNII: 4L1997J4DF
- KEGG: D11124

Chemical and physical data
- Formula: C_{6556}H_{10114}N_{1730}O_{2100}S_{44}
- Molar mass: 148179.68 g·mol^{−1}

Suvratoxumab (INN; development code MEDI4893) is a human monoclonal antibody designed for the prevention of nosocomial pneumonia caused by Staphylococcus aureus.

This drug was developed by MedImmune
