= Patritumab =

Monoclonal antibody

Monoclonal antibody
- Type: Whole antibody
- Source: Human
- Target: HER3

Clinical data
- ATC code: none

Identifiers
- CAS Number: 1262787-83-6
- ChemSpider: none
- UNII: 86780VJI1Q
- KEGG: D12185

Patritumab (INN) is a human monoclonal antibody designed for the treatment of cancer. It acts as an immunomodulator.

== Clinical trials ==
It is in a phase 2 clinical trial for squamous cell cancer of the head and neck.

It is to be included in a new arm of the I-SPY 2 breast cancer trial.
