= Rinucumab =

Monoclonal antibody

Monoclonal antibody
- Type: ?
- Source: Human
- Target: platelet-derived growth factor receptor beta

Clinical data
- Other names: REGN2176
- ATC code: none

Identifiers
- CAS Number: 1569263-06-4
- ChemSpider: none
- UNII: 10E3O6YI4W

Chemical and physical data
- Formula: C_{6472}H_{9974}N_{1710}O_{2022}S_{38}
- Molar mass: 145309.21 g·mol^{−1}

Rinucumab (REGN2176) is a monoclonal antibody designed for the treatment of neovascular age-related macular degeneration.

This drug was developed by Regeneron Pharmaceuticals, Inc.
