= Lampalizumab =

Monoclonal antibody

Monoclonal antibody
- Type: Fab fragment
- Source: Humanized (from mouse)
- Target: CFD

Clinical data
- Routes of administration: Intravitreal
- ATC code: none

Identifiers
- CAS Number: 1278466-20-8
- IUPHAR/BPS: 8294
- ChemSpider: none
- UNII: UWU93Y99R3
- KEGG: D10440

Chemical and physical data
- Formula: C_{2068}H_{3214}N_{546}O_{676}S_{13}
- Molar mass: 46958.39 g·mol^{−1}

Lampalizumab (INN) is an antigen-binding fragment of a humanized monoclonal antibody that binds to complement factor D; it was developed as a potential treatment of geographic atrophy (atrophy of the retinal cells, retinal pigment epithelium, and choriocapillaris) secondary to age-related macular degeneration.

One of the two Phase 3 clinical trials (Spectri) was interrupted on September 8, 2017 due to failure to meet primary end point. The second Phase 3 clinical trial (Chroma) also failed to meet its primary end point.

These two failures have called into question whether complement inhibition is a sound strategy for geographic atrophy.
