= Flanvotumab =

Monoclonal antibody

Monoclonal antibody
- Type: Whole antibody
- Source: Human
- Target: HGF

Clinical data
- ATC code: none

Identifiers
- CAS Number: 1188277-05-5
- ChemSpider: none
- UNII: ZNV4738BS6
- KEGG: D10124

Chemical and physical data
- Formula: C_{6470}H_{9986}N_{1714}O_{2018}S_{46}
- Molar mass: 145545.80 g·mol^{−1}

Flanvotumab, also known as IMC-20D7S, is a human monoclonal antibody designed for the treatment of melanoma. It targets TYRP1.

Flanvotumab was developed by ImClone Systems, now owned by Eli Lilly. It was discontinued in 2012.
