= Ozanezumab =

Monoclonal antibody

Monoclonal antibody
- Type: ?
- Source: Humanized (from mouse)
- Target: Nogo-A

Clinical data
- ATC code: none

Identifiers
- CAS Number: 1310680-64-8
- ChemSpider: none
- UNII: 123I05210W
- KEGG: D10331

Chemical and physical data
- Formula: C_{6446}H_{10016}N_{1712}O_{2010}S_{48}
- Molar mass: 145195.89 g·mol^{−1}

Ozanezumab is a monoclonal antibody designed for the treatment of ALS and multiple sclerosis.

Ozanezumab targets a protein called Neurite Outgrowth Inhibitor (NOGO-A) or Reticulon 4 (RTN4). NOGO-A is a protein that in humans is encoded by the RTN4 gene that has been identified as an inhibitor of neurite outgrowth specific to the central nervous system. NOGO-A is found at higher than normal levels in persons with ALS.

This drug was developed by GlaxoSmithKline (GSK) under the identifier GSK 1223249.

== Mechanism ==
From an announced phase II clinical trial by GSK:

NOGO-A blocks neurons from growing toward muscle once the connection has been made. When motor neurons degenerate and the connection becomes weakened, NOGO-A would work against keeping that nerve/muscle contact strong. Increased NOGO-A has been observed in muscle of people with ALS and ozanezumab delayed symptom onset and improved survival in ALS model mice. Thus, it is hoped that it will preserve muscle function and slow the rate of ALS progression in humans.

=== (Monoclonal) Antibodies ===
The antibodies in our body work by binding to foreign material (such as bacteria and viruses) so that it is no longer dangerous and can be 'labelled for destruction' for white blood cells. Monoclonal antibodies, like ozanezumab, are commercially designed antibodies which 'mop up' and bind to a specific target, in this case Nogo-A. This means that ozanezumab is able to help limit the loss of connections between motor neurones and muscles.

== Administration ==
Ozanezumab is an intravenous drug (administered directly into the blood stream).

== Human Trials ==
=== Previous Trials ===
Although some positive trends were observed in the exploratory exposure response analyses, given the small sample size, caution should be used in the interpretation of the exposure-response analyses.

GlaxoSmithKline lists three reports with results of phase I studies:

1. A Single and Repeat Dose Escalation Study of the Safety, Pharmacokinetics and Pharmacodynamics of GSK1223249 in Patients with ALS. — 111330
2. A randomized, double-blind, placebo-controlled, single ascending dose study exploring the preliminary safety, tolerability and pharmacokinetics of GSK1223249 administered by intravenous (IV) infusion to patients with relapsing forms of multiple sclerosis, not on disease modifying therapy. — 112988
3. A randomized, single blind, placebo-controlled, single ascending dose/repeat dose cohort study to assess safety, tolerability, pharmacokinetics and immunogenicity of GSK1223249 in patients with relapsing forms of multiple sclerosis. — 114840

=== Current ===
A Phase II trial completed in 2015.
