= Emibetuzumab =

Monoclonal antibody

Monoclonal antibody
- Type: ?
- Source: Humanized (from mouse)
- Target: HGFR

Clinical data
- Other names: LY2875358
- ATC code: none

Identifiers
- CAS Number: 1365287-97-3
- IUPHAR/BPS: 7748
- ChemSpider: none
- UNII: MO4K3GDN1I

Chemical and physical data
- Formula: C_{6356}H_{9810}N_{1694}O_{2014}S_{48}
- Molar mass: 143719.12 g·mol^{−1}

Emibetuzumab (INN; development code LY2875358) is a humanized monoclonal antibody designed for the treatment of cancer. It is in phase II trials for patients with non-small-cell lung cancer (NSCLC). This drug was developed by Eli Lilly & Company.
