= Figitumumab =

Chemical compound

Monoclonal antibody
- Type: Whole antibody
- Source: Human
- Target: IGF-1 receptor

Clinical data
- ATC code: none

Legal status
- Legal status: Experimental

Identifiers
- CAS Number: 943453-46-1
- ChemSpider: none
- UNII: VE267FC2UB
- KEGG: D09345

Chemical and physical data
- Formula: C_{6462}H_{9948}N_{1736}O_{2020}S_{54}
- Molar mass: 146008.04 g·mol^{−1}

Figitumumab (previously CP-751871) is a monoclonal antibody targeting the insulin-like growth factor-1 receptor that was investigated for the treatment of various types of cancer, for example adrenocortical carcinoma and non-small cell lung cancer (NSCLC).

This drug was being developed by Pfizer, but they ceased development of the drug in January 2011 and has stopped its manufacture.

== Anti-cancer mechanism ==
See Insulin-like growth factor 1 receptor role in cancer.

== Clinical trials ==
The first phase III trial (for NSCLC) was suspended in December 2009 due to excess deaths but others continued.

It was to have been included in the I-SPY2 breast cancer trial.
