= Oleclumab =

Monoclonal antibody

Monoclonal antibody
- Type: ?
- Source: Human
- Target: 5'-nucleotidase NT5E

Clinical data
- Other names: MEDI9447
- ATC code: none

Identifiers
- CAS Number: 1803176-05-7
- ChemSpider: none
- UNII: 5CRY01URYQ
- KEGG: D10963

Chemical and physical data
- Formula: C_{6348}H_{9826}N_{1710}O_{1998}S_{40}
- Molar mass: 143350.81 g·mol^{−1}

Oleclumab (INN; development code MEDI9447) is a human monoclonal antibody targeting the ectonucleotidase CD73 that was designed for the treatment of pancreatic and colorectal and other cancers.

This drug was developed by MedImmune/AstraZeneca.
