= Ulocuplumab =

Monoclonal antibody

Monoclonal antibody
- Type: Whole antibody
- Source: Human
- Target: C-X-C chemokine receptor type 4

Clinical data
- Other names: MDX-1338
- ATC code: none

Identifiers
- CAS Number: 1375830-34-4
- ChemSpider: none
- UNII: 7KNP87L4X4

Chemical and physical data
- Formula: C_{6486}H_{9960}N_{1720}O_{2046}S_{46}
- Molar mass: 146243.78 g·mol^{−1}

Ulocuplumab (INN; development code MDX-1338) is a monoclonal antibody designed for the treatment of hematologic malignancies. Ulocuplumab targets CXCR4.

This drug was developed by Bristol-Myers Squibb.
