= Futuximab =

Monoclonal antibody

Monoclonal antibody
- Type: Whole antibody
- Source: Chimeric (mouse/human)
- Target: HER1

Clinical data
- Other names: 992 DS
- ATC code: none

Identifiers
- CAS Number: 1310460-85-5
- ChemSpider: none
- UNII: B37J680LX0

Chemical and physical data
- Formula: C_{6468}H_{10002}N_{1724}O_{2055}S_{46}
- Molar mass: 146269.94 g·mol^{−1}

Futuximab (992 DS) (INN) is a chimeric monoclonal antibody designed for the treatment of cancer. It acts as an immunomodulator and also binds to HER1.

This drug was developed by Symphogen.
