= Suptavumab =

Monoclonal antibody

Monoclonal antibody
- Type: ?
- Source: Human
- Target: respiratory syncytial virus fusion protein

Clinical data
- Other names: REGN2222
- ATC code: none

Identifiers
- CAS Number: 1629615-23-1
- ChemSpider: none
- UNII: A0ZE931055
- KEGG: D10991

Chemical and physical data
- Formula: C_{6502}H_{10038}N_{1726}O_{2020}S_{42}
- Molar mass: 146054.41 g·mol^{−1}

Suptavumab (INN; development code (REGN2222) is a humanized monoclonal antibody designed for the prevention of medically attended lower respiratory tract disease due to respiratory syncytial virus.

This experimental drug candidate was being developed by Regeneron Pharmaceuticals Inc until it was discontinued after unsuccessful Phase III clinical trials.
