= Eldelumab =

Monoclonal antibody

Monoclonal antibody
- Type: Whole antibody
- Source: Human
- Target: CXCL10/IP-10

Clinical data
- ATC code: none

Identifiers
- CAS Number: 946414-98-8
- ChemSpider: none
- UNII: 15O91A27I5
- KEGG: D10404

Chemical and physical data
- Formula: C_{6502}H_{10024}N_{1736}O_{2026}S_{48}
- Molar mass: 146468.72 g·mol^{−1}

Eldelumab (alternative identifier BMS-936557) is a fully human monoclonal antibody (type IgG1 kappa) that targets chemokine (C-X-C motif) ligand 10 (CXCL10)/Interferon-γ-inducible protein-10 (IP-10) designed for the treatment of Crohn's disease and ulcerative colitis.

This drug was developed by Bristol-Myers Squibb and Medarex.
