= Fletikumab =

Monoclonal antibody

Monoclonal antibody
- Type: ?
- Target: IL20

Clinical data
- Other names: NNC0109-0012
- ATC code: none

Identifiers
- CAS Number: 1357158-22-5
- ChemSpider: none
- UNII: 82WG3POL9W
- KEGG: D11756
- ChEMBL: ChEMBL3301580

Chemical and physical data
- Formula: C_{6494}H_{10000}N_{1728}O_{2050}S_{44}
- Molar mass: 146492.12 g·mol^{−1}

Fletikumab (NNC0109-0012) (INN) is a monoclonal antibody designed for the treatment of rheumatoid arthritis that targets IL-20.

This drug was being developed by Novo Nordisk A/S until Novo ceased work in inflammation.
