= Imgatuzumab =

Monoclonal antibody

Monoclonal antibody
- Type: Whole antibody
- Source: Humanized (from rat)
- Target: EGFR

Clinical data
- ATC code: none

Identifiers
- CAS Number: 959963-46-3
- ChemSpider: none
- UNII: V77J4WJF9Z
- KEGG: D10439

Chemical and physical data
- Formula: C_{6434}H_{9942}N_{1718}O_{2016}S_{44}
- Molar mass: 145028.96 g·mol^{−1}

Imgatuzumab (INN) is a humanized monoclonal antibody designed for the treatment of cancer. It is an anti-EGFR antibody that acts as an immunomodulator.

The drug was developed by Genentech/Roche.
