= Taplitumomab paptox =

Monoclonal antibody

Monoclonal antibody
- Type: Whole antibody
- Source: Mouse
- Target: CD19

Clinical data
- ATC code: none

Identifiers
- CAS Number: 235428-87-2
- ChemSpider: none
- UNII: AR3ULB33ZZ

Taplitumomab paptox is a mouse monoclonal antibody. The antibody itself, taplitumomab, is linked to the protein PAP, an antiviral from Phytolacca americana, a species of pokeweed. This is reflected by the 'paptox' in the drug's name.
