= Modotuximab =

Monoclonal antibody

Monoclonal antibody
- Type: Whole antibody
- Source: Chimeric
- Target: HER1

Clinical data
- ATC code: none

Identifiers
- CAS Number: 1310460-86-6
- ChemSpider: none
- UNII: 1W7BD1M08N
- KEGG: D11125

Modotuximab (INN; formerly zatuximab) is a chimeric monoclonal antibody designed for the treatment of cancer. It acts as an immunomodulator and binds to HER1.
