= Lenvervimab =

Monoclonal antibody

Monoclonal antibody
- Type: ?
- Source: Humanized
- Target: hepatitis B virus surface antigen

Clinical data
- Other names: GC1102
- ATC code: none

Identifiers
- CAS Number: 2055006-79-4
- DrugBank: DB17814
- UNII: FX9X4L2A2L

Lenvervimab (INN; development code GC1102) is a monoclonal antibody that is being investigated for hepatitis B.

This drug is being developed by GC Pharma. As of 2018, lenvervimab is undergoing Phase II/III trials.
