= Adecatumumab =

Chemical compound

Monoclonal antibody
- Type: Whole antibody
- Source: Human
- Target: EpCAM

Clinical data
- ATC code: none

Identifiers
- CAS Number: 503605-66-1
- ChemSpider: none
- UNII: 000705ZASD

Chemical and physical data
- Formula: C_{6552}H_{10080}N_{1740}O_{2052}S_{46}
- Molar mass: 147533.60 g·mol^{−1}

Adecatumumab (MT201) is a recombinant human IgG1 monoclonal antibody which is used to target tumor cells. It binds to the epithelial cell adhesion molecule (EpCAM - CD326), with the intent to trigger antibody-dependent cellular cytotoxicity. It was developed by Micromet Inc, which was acquired by Amgen.

Adecatumumab has been used in clinical studies of treatment in colorectal, prostate and breast cancers. Phase II results were published in 2010.
