= Ontuxizumab =

Monoclonal antibody

Monoclonal antibody
- Type: Whole antibody
- Source: Chimeric/humanized hybrid (mouse/human)
- Target: TEM1

Clinical data
- ATC code: none

Identifiers
- CAS Number: 946415-62-9
- ChemSpider: none
- UNII: 0M2XT000YC

Chemical and physical data
- Formula: C_{6532}H_{10050}N_{1726}O_{2054}S_{44}
- Molar mass: 147034.92 g·mol^{−1}

Ontuxizumab is a humanized rabbit monoclonal antibody designed for the treatment of cancer. It binds to endosialin (TEM1 or CD248).

Phase I trials are complete and the drug was granted orphan drug status by the FDA for sarcoma. It is currently in phase II trials for melanoma, colorectal cancer, sarcoma, and lymphoma.

This drug was developed by Morphotek and Ludwig Institute for Cancer Research.
