= Iodine (131 I) derlotuximab biotin =

Pharmaceutical drug

Monoclonal antibody
- Type: ?
- Source: Chimeric (mouse/human)
- Target: histone complex

Clinical data
- Trade names: Cotara, Vivatuxin
- ATC code: none

Identifiers
- CAS Number: 340013-96-9
- ChemSpider: none
- UNII: 1724UJB90B

Chemical and physical data
- Formula: C_{6436}H_{9960}N_{1704}O_{2022}S_{46}
- Molar mass: 145035.14 g·mol^{−1}

Iodine (^{131} I) derlotuximab biotin is a monoclonal antibody designed for the treatment of recurrent glioblastoma multiforme.

The drug was developed by Avid Bioservices, formerly known as Peregrine Pharmaceuticals, Inc. due to a cease in research and development of oncogenic drugs in favor of becoming a dedicated contract manufacturer of medicinal drugs.

This drug, under the brand name vivatuxin, has been approved for treatment of lung cancer in China since 2007.
