= Duligotuzumab =

Monoclonal antibody

Monoclonal antibody
- Type: Whole antibody
- Source: Human
- Target: HER3

Clinical data
- ATC code: none

Identifiers
- CAS Number: 1314238-96-4
- ChemSpider: none
- UNII: 8PMF8YQX2T
- KEGG: D11750

Duligotuzumab (INN) is a bispecific humanized IgG1 monoclonal antibody designed for the treatment of cancer. It acts as an immunomodulator and binds to EGFR and HER3. It is in development by Roche. Clinical development for head and neck cancer and colorectal cancer have been discontinued, but phase I trials in combination with cobimetinib are evaluating safety for treatment of solid tumors.
