= Icrucumab =

Monoclonal antibody

Monoclonal antibody
- Type: Whole antibody
- Source: Human
- Target: VEGFR-1

Clinical data
- Other names: IMC-18F1
- ATC code: none

Identifiers
- CAS Number: 1024603-92-6
- ChemSpider: none
- UNII: T7H0B1R64U
- KEGG: D09926

Chemical and physical data
- Formula: C_{6514}H_{10024}N_{1756}O_{2032}S_{42}
- Molar mass: 146796.63 g·mol^{−1}

Icrucumab (IMC-18F1) is a human monoclonal antibody designed for the treatment of solid tumors.

Icrucumab was developed by ImClone Systems Inc. It is undergoing Phase I trials.
