= Parsatuzumab =

Monoclonal antibody

Monoclonal antibody
- Type: Whole antibody
- Source: Humanized (from mouse)
- Target: EGFL7

Clinical data
- ATC code: none

Identifiers
- CAS Number: 1312797-14-0
- ChemSpider: none
- UNII: 435M4HCP2M

Chemical and physical data
- Formula: C_{6560}H_{10130}N_{1758}O_{2046}S_{46}
- Molar mass: 147836.22 g·mol^{−1}

Parsatuzumab (INN) is a humanized monoclonal antibody designed for the treatment of cancer. It acts as an immunomodulator and binds to EGFL7.

This drug was developed by Genentech/Roche.
