= Carotuximab =

Monoclonal antibody

Monoclonal antibody
- Type: ?
- Source: Chimeric (mouse/human)
- Target: endoglin

Clinical data
- Other names: TRC-105
- ATC code: none

Identifiers
- CAS Number: 1268714-50-6
- ChemSpider: none
- UNII: YB2EWE6139
- KEGG: D11260

Chemical and physical data
- Formula: C_{6420}H_{9922}N_{1718}O_{2010}S_{46}
- Molar mass: 144808.77 g·mol^{−1}

Carotuximab (INN) (TRC-105) is a chimeric monoclonal antibody designed for the treatment of cancer.

This drug was developed by Tracon Pharmaceuticals Inc.

It is at Phase III trials for angiosarcoma.
