= Imalumab =

Monoclonal antibody

Monoclonal antibody
- Type: ?

Clinical data
- Other names: BAX69

Legal status
- Legal status: Investigational

Identifiers
- CAS Number: 1430205-07-4
- UNII: 22F97PC79G

Imalumab (BAX69) is an experimental monoclonal antibody against macrophage inhibitory factor (MIF), a cytokine known to exacerbate tumor growth. and as of January 2017 it is being tested in Phase IIa clinical trials for metastatic colorectal cancer. It was developed by Cytokine PharmaSciences and Baxalta, which was purchased by Shire Pharmaceuticals.

A phase I/II trial in patients with malignant ascites was terminated in 2016.
