= Tarextumab =

Monoclonal antibody

Monoclonal antibody
- Type: ?
- Source: Human
- Target: Notch 2, Notch 3

Clinical data
- Other names: OMP-59R5
- ATC code: none

Legal status
- Legal status: Investigational

Identifiers
- CAS Number: 1359940-55-8
- ChemSpider: none
- UNII: 333YMY788E
- KEGG: D11775

Chemical and physical data
- Formula: C_{6338}H_{9804}N_{1700}O_{1990}S_{48}
- Molar mass: 143196.94 g·mol^{−1}

Tarextumab (formerly OMP-59R5) is a fully human monoclonal antibody targeting the Notch 2/3 receptors. It is being tested as a possible treatment for cancer. In January 2015, the US FDA granted orphan drug designation to tarextumab for the treatment of pancreatic cancer and lung cancer. Two early stage clinical trials have reported encouraging results.

== See also ==
- Notch signaling pathway, e.g. in embryo tissue development
