= Ozoralizumab =

Monoclonal antibody

Monoclonal antibody
- Type: Whole antibody
- Source: Humanized

Clinical data
- Trade names: Nanozora
- ATC code: none

Legal status
- Legal status: Rx in Japan

Identifiers
- CAS Number: 1167985-17-2
- ChemSpider: none
- UNII: 05ZCK72TXZ
- KEGG: D09944

Chemical and physical data
- Formula: C_{1682}H_{2608}N_{472}O_{538}S_{12}
- Molar mass: 38434.85 g·mol^{−1}

Ozoralizumab (trade name Nanozora) is a trivalent anti-tumour necrosis factor alpha (TNFα) nanobody designed for the treatment of inflammatory diseases.

Ozoralizumab was developed by Pfizer Inc, and now belongs to Ablynx NV. Ablynx has licensed the rights to the antibody in China to Eddingpharm. In 2022, ozoralizumab was approved in Japan for the treatment of rheumatoid arthritis.
