= Orticumab =

Monoclonal antibody

Monoclonal antibody
- Type: Whole antibody
- Source: Human
- Target: oxLDL

Clinical data
- ATC code: none

Identifiers
- CAS Number: 1314241-10-5
- ChemSpider: none
- UNII: 2O892R8U24

Orticumab (INN) is a human monoclonal antibody that is used as an anti-inflammatory agent and binds to oxLDL. It acts as an immunomodulator.
