= Onartuzumab =

Chemical compound

Monoclonal antibody
- Type: Fab fragment
- Source: Humanized (from mouse)
- Target: scatter factor receptor kinase

Clinical data
- ATC code: none

Identifiers
- CAS Number: 1133766-06-9
- ChemSpider: none
- UNII: MS1J9720WC

Chemical and physical data
- Formula: C_{4422}H_{6820}N_{1168}O_{1363}S_{31}
- Molar mass: 99147.88 g·mol^{−1}

Onartuzumab is a humanized monoclonal antibody designed for the treatment of advanced non-small-cell lung cancer.

Onartuzumab was developed by Genentech, Inc. It is undergoing clinical trials.
