= Diridavumab =

Monoclonal antibody

Monoclonal antibody
- Type: ?
- Source: Human
- Target: hemagglutinin

Clinical data
- Other names: CR6261
- ATC code: none

Identifiers
- CAS Number: 1393659-46-5
- ChemSpider: none
- UNII: JFC86A9HL9

Chemical and physical data
- Formula: C_{6400}H_{9934}N_{1702}O_{1996}S_{48}
- Molar mass: 144196.67 g·mol^{−1}

Diridavumab (CR6261) (INN) is a monoclonal antibody designed for the treatment of influenza A.

This drug was developed by Janssen Pharmaceutical Companies of Johnson & Johnson.
