= Namilumab =

Monoclonal antibody

Monoclonal antibody
- Type: Whole antibody
- Source: Human
- Target: CSF2

Clinical data
- ATC code: none

Identifiers
- CAS Number: 1206681-39-1
- ChemSpider: none
- UNII: MED485W763

Namilumab (alternative identifier MT203) is a human monoclonal antibody (class IgG1 kappa) that targets granulocyte macrophage-colony stimulating factor (GM-CSF)/colony stimulating factor 2 (CSF2) and is currently being researched for application in rheumatoid arthritis (RA) and psoriatic arthritis. Clinical trials investigating the therapeutic utility of Namilumab have include phase I and phase II clinical trials to establish the safety, tolerability and preliminary therapeutic utility of the antibody in plaque psoriasis and rheumatoid arthritis.

Namilumab was produced by Micromet Inc and is under development by Takeda Pharmaceuticals International.
