= Andecaliximab =

Monoclonal antibody

Monoclonal antibody
- Type: ?
- Source: Chimeric (mouse/human)
- Target: gelatinase B

Clinical data
- Other names: GS-5745
- ATC code: none

Identifiers
- CAS Number: 1518996-49-0
- ChemSpider: none
- UNII: 571045EIM4
- KEGG: D11262

Chemical and physical data
- Formula: C_{6396}H_{9868}N_{1680}O_{2010}S_{46}
- Molar mass: 143933.81 g·mol^{−1}

Andecaliximab (INN; development code GS-5745) is an experimental humanized monoclonal antibody designed for the treatment of cancer and inflammatory diseases.

This drug was developed by Gilead Sciences, Inc.

Phase II and phase III trials for gastric cancer or gastroesophageal junction adenocarcinoma completed in 2019.
