= Perakizumab =

Medication used to treat arthritis

Monoclonal antibody
- Type: Whole antibody
- Source: Humanized (from mouse)
- Target: IL17A

Clinical data
- ATC code: none

Identifiers
- CAS Number: 1331830-76-2
- ChemSpider: none
- UNII: 867X5909JO

Chemical and physical data
- Formula: C_{6454}H_{9964}N_{1718}O_{2030}S_{44}
- Molar mass: 145515.34 g·mol^{−1}

Perakizumab (INN) is a humanized monoclonal antibody designed for the treatment of arthritis. It binds to IL17A and acts as an immunomodulator.

This drug was developed by Genentech/Roche.
