= Bleselumab =

Monoclonal antibody

Monoclonal antibody
- Type: Whole antibody
- Source: Human
- Target: CD40

Clinical data
- Other names: ASKP1240
- ATC code: none

Identifiers
- CAS Number: 1453067-91-8
- ChemSpider: none
- UNII: AS3AZ5R46K
- KEGG: D11357

Chemical and physical data
- Formula: C_{6412}H_{9906}N_{1690}O_{2018}S_{38}
- Molar mass: 144175.87 g·mol^{−1}

Bleselumab (INN; development code ASKP1240) is a human monoclonal antibody designed for the prevention of organ transplant rejection.

This drug was developed by Kyowa Kirin, Inc.
