= Oxelumab =

Monoclonal antibody

Monoclonal antibody
- Type: Whole antibody
- Source: Human
- Target: OX-40 ligand

Clinical data
- ATC code: none

Identifiers
- CAS Number: 1186098-83-8
- ChemSpider: none
- UNII: 67GFR7JCMN

Chemical and physical data
- Formula: C_{6424}H_{9920}N_{1704}O_{2014}S_{42}
- Molar mass: 144594.46 g·mol^{−1}

Oxelumab is a human monoclonal antibody targeting OX40L designed for the treatment of asthma.

Oxelumab was developed by Genentech and co-developed by Roche.
