= Placulumab =

Monoclonal antibody

Monoclonal antibody
- Type: ?
- Source: Human
- Target: TNF

Clinical data
- ATC code: none

Identifiers
- CAS Number: 945781-29-3
- ChemSpider: none
- UNII: S80W9W569L
- KEGG: D10320

Chemical and physical data
- Formula: C_{3404}H_{5262}N_{902}O_{1036}S_{22}
- Molar mass: 76104.14 g·mol^{−1}

Placulumab is a human monoclonal antibody designed for the treatment of inflammatory diseases.

This drug was developed by Teva Pharmaceutical Industries, Inc. As of 2012, development of placulumab has been discontinued.
