= Rosmantuzumab =

Monoclonal antibody

Monoclonal antibody
- Type: ?
- Source: Humanized (from mouse)
- Target: RSPO3

Clinical data
- Other names: OMP-131R10
- ATC code: none

Identifiers
- CAS Number: 1684393-04-1
- ChemSpider: none
- UNII: VD026R6TCI
- KEGG: D11369

Chemical and physical data
- Formula: C_{6456}H_{9954}N_{1714}O_{2048}S_{46}
- Molar mass: 145825.36 g·mol^{−1}

Rosmantuzumab (INN; development code OMP-131R10) is a humanized monoclonal antibody designed for the treatment of cancer.

This drug was developed by OncoMed Pharmaceuticals.
