= Ascrinvacumab =

Chemical compound

Monoclonal antibody
- Type: ?
- Source: Human
- Target: activin receptor-like kinase 1

Clinical data
- Other names: PF-03446962
- ATC code: none

Identifiers
- CAS Number: 1463459-96-2
- ChemSpider: none
- UNII: 716FQ5REVO
- KEGG: D11709

Chemical and physical data
- Formula: C_{6396}H_{9850}N_{1694}O_{2012}S_{44}
- Molar mass: 144079.64 g·mol^{−1}

Ascrinvacumab (PF-03446962) is a monoclonal antibody designed for the treatment of cancer. It is an ALK1 inhibitor.

This drug was developed by Pfizer Inc.
