= Panobacumab =

Monoclonal antibody designed as an antibacterial against Pseudomonas aeruginosa

Monoclonal antibody
- Type: Whole antibody
- Source: Human
- Target: Pseudomonas aeruginosa serotype IATS O11

Clinical data
- ATC code: none

Identifiers
- CAS Number: 885053-97-4
- ChemSpider: none
- UNII: 62B4OXU259

Chemical and physical data
- Formula: C_{38714}H_{60189}N_{10637}O_{12187}S_{322}
- Molar mass: 879959.96 g·mol^{−1}

Panobacumab (proposed INN) is a monoclonal antibody designed as an antibacterial against Pseudomonas aeruginosa.

It is a fully human pentameric IgM antibody with a mouse J chain.

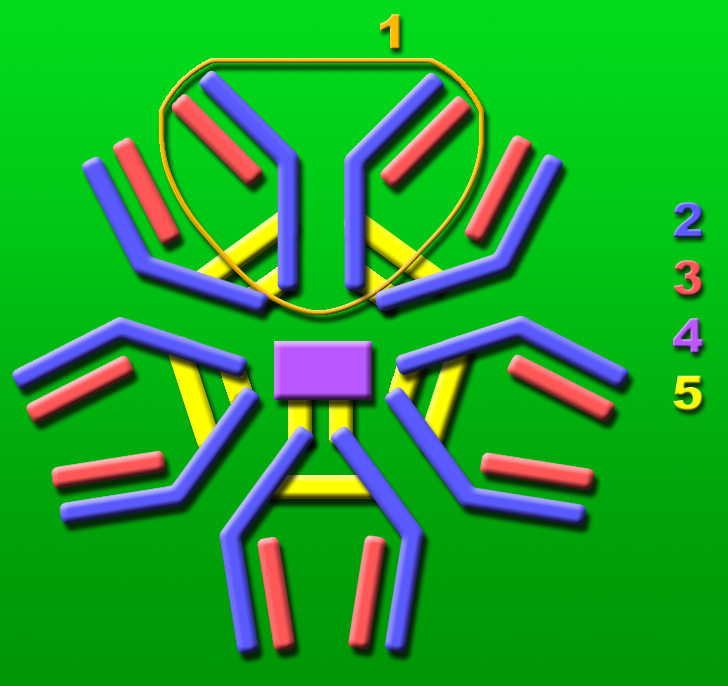
Panobacumab molecule consisting of five base units. 1: Base unit. 2: Heavy chains. 3: Light chains. 4: J chain. 5: Intermolecular disulfide bonds.

== Development ==
Panobacumab is being developed by Aridis Pharmaceuticals. As of November 15th it is in phase 2 clinical trials. The originator was Berna Biotech.

The mechanism of action is as a lipopolysaccharide inhibitor.
