= Nesvacumab =

Monoclonal antibody

Monoclonal antibody
- Type: Whole antibody
- Source: Human
- Target: Angiopoietin 2

Clinical data
- ATC code: none

Legal status
- Legal status: Investigational

Identifiers
- CAS Number: 1296818-77-3
- IUPHAR/BPS: 8457
- ChemSpider: none
- UNII: WX8293WGLC
- KEGG: D10395

Chemical and physical data
- Formula: C_{6440}H_{9966}N_{1722}O_{2008}S_{38}
- Molar mass: 144860.89 g·mol^{−1}

Nesvacumab is an experimental monoclonal antibody originally designed for the treatment of cancer. It targets the protein angiopoietin 2. As of May 2017, the drug was in Phase II clinical trials for the treatment of diabetic macular edema.

This drug is being developed by Regeneron Pharmaceuticals.
