= DLL4 =

Protein-coding gene in the species Homo sapiens

Identifiers
- Aliases: DLL4, hdelta2, AOS6, delta like canonical Notch ligand 4, delta4
- External IDs: OMIM: 605185; MGI: 1859388; HomoloGene: 10411; GeneCards: DLL4; OMA:DLL4 - orthologs

Gene location (Human)
Chr.	Chromosome 15 (human)
Band	15q15.1	Start	40,929,340 bp
Band	15q15.1	End	40,939,073 bp

Gene location (Mouse)
Chr.	Chromosome 2 (mouse)
Band	2|2 E5	Start	119,156,265 bp
Band	2|2 E5	End	119,166,443 bp
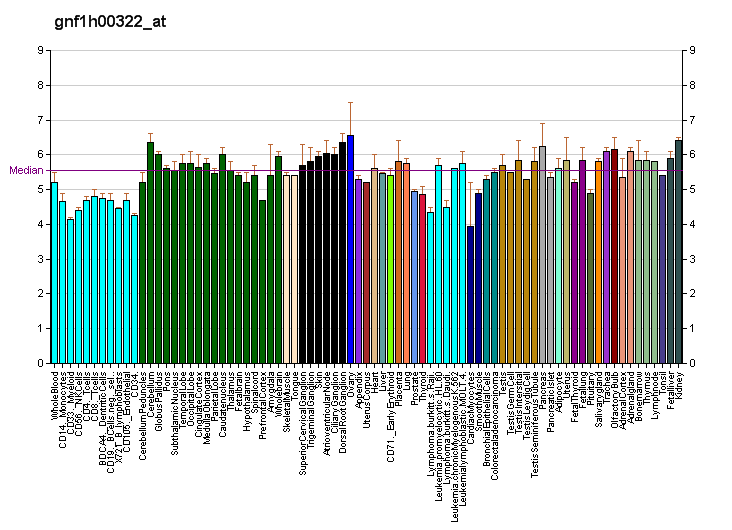
RNA expression pattern
Bgee	Human / Mouse (ortholog); Top expressed in: vena cava; apex of heart; body of tongue; pericardium; upper lobe of left lung; subcutaneous adipose tissue; left ventricle; atrium; right atrium; cardia / Top expressed in: interventricular septum; vasculature of trunk; lamina propria of small intestine; umbilical artery; dorsal aorta; right lung; endothelium of artery; right ventricle; gastrula; right lung lobe; More reference expression data
BioGPS	More reference expression data
Gene ontology
Molecular function	calcium ion binding; Notch binding; protein binding
Cellular component	integral component of membrane; membrane; plasma membrane
Biological process	Notch signaling pathway; dorsal aorta morphogenesis; cell differentiation; negative regulation of blood vessel endothelial cell migration; response to stimulus; negative regulation of transcription by RNA polymerase II; blood vessel lumenization; cellular response to fibroblast growth factor stimulus; blood circulation; negative regulation of gene expression; nervous system development; ventricular trabecula myocardium morphogenesis; negative regulation of endothelial cell migration; regulation of neural retina development; positive regulation of neural precursor cell proliferation; negative regulation of cell migration involved in sprouting angiogenesis; cell communication; multicellular organism development; blood vessel remodeling; T cell differentiation; positive regulation of gene expression; ventral spinal cord interneuron fate commitment; angiogenesis; pericardium morphogenesis; negative regulation of blood vessel endothelial cell proliferation involved in sprouting angiogenesis; branching involved in blood vessel morphogenesis; cellular response to vascular endothelial growth factor stimulus; cardiac atrium morphogenesis; cardiac ventricle morphogenesis; regulation of neurogenesis; signal transduction; visual perception; negative regulation of cell population proliferation; negative regulation of Notch signaling pathway; positive regulation of Notch signaling pathway; Notch signaling involved in heart development; aortic valve morphogenesis
Sources:Amigo / QuickGO
Orthologs
Species	Human	Mouse
Entrez	54567	54485
Ensembl	ENSG00000128917	ENSMUSG00000027314
UniProt	Q9NR61	Q9JI71
RefSeq (mRNA)	NM_019074	NM_019454
RefSeq (protein)	NP_061947	NP_062327
Location (UCSC)	Chr 15: 40.93 – 40.94 Mb	Chr 2: 119.16 – 119.17 Mb
PubMed search
- Wikidata
View/Edit Human	View/Edit Mouse

Delta-like 4 is a protein that in humans is encoded by the DLL4 gene.

This gene is a homolog of the Drosophila delta gene. The delta gene family encodes Notch ligands that are characterized by a DSL domain, EGF repeats, and a transmembrane domain.
