= Landogrozumab =

Monoclonal antibody

Monoclonal antibody
- Type: Whole antibody
- Source: Humanized (from mouse)
- Target: GDF-8

Clinical data
- Other names: LY2495655
- ATC code: none

Identifiers
- CAS Number: 1391726-30-9
- ChemSpider: none
- UNII: B1792M902R
- KEGG: D11235

Chemical and physical data
- Formula: C_{6338}H_{9790}N_{1694}O_{1988}S_{42}
- Molar mass: 142874.43 g·mol^{−1}

Landogrozumab (INN; development code LY2495655) is a humanized monoclonal antibody and experimental pharmaceutical drug designed for the treatment of muscle wasting disorders.

The drug was developed by Eli Lilly and Company.
