= Bimagrumab =

Chemical compound

Monoclonal antibody
- Type: ?
- Source: Human
- Target: ACVR2B

Clinical data
- Other names: BYM338
- Routes of administration: Intravenous
- ATC code: none

Identifiers
- CAS Number: 1356922-05-8
- ChemSpider: none
- UNII: N15SW1DIV8
- KEGG: D10620

Chemical and physical data
- Formula: C_{6306}H_{9732}N_{1684}O_{1990}S_{46}
- Molar mass: 142451.78 g·mol^{−1}

Bimagrumab (BYM338) is a human monoclonal antibody first developed by Novartis and currently by Eli Lilly to treat pathological muscle loss and weakness. It binds to and inhibits activin receptor type-2B.

Bimagrumab must be administered intravenously at a hospital or clinic. The medication has a long half-life and is administered once a month.

== Development history ==
Bimagrumab was developed by Novartis, in collaboration with Morphosys. On August 20, 2013, it was announced that bimagrumab had received a breakthrough therapy designation for sporadic inclusion body myositis (sIBM) by the US Food and Drug Administration (FDA).

In 2014, Bimagrumab entered Phase II development, with some research indicating clinical effects. Novartis planned to apply in 2016 for FDA approval to treat sIBM patients with bimagrumab.

In April 2016, Novartis announced that bimagrumab had failed a Phase IIb/III study for sporadic inclusion body myositis. In January 2021, a new study confirmed that treatment with bimagrumab is safe and effective for treating excess adiposity and metabolic disturbances of adult patients with obesity and type 2 diabetes. Novartis then licensed the drug to Versanis Bio, a Medicxi Fund and Atlas Venture-backed startup, who closed a series A financing round to fund a phase II clinical program targeting weight loss in obese patients. In January 2023 Versanis Bio entered the medication into phase IIb trials for obesity. In July 2023, Eli Lilly bought Versanis Bio for their weight loss asset for $1.9 billion.

In 2025, a phase IIb study was concluded testing bimagrumab in combination with Novo Nordisk's semaglutide, demonstrating that the combination resulted in a greater loss of fat as a percentage of weight compared to semaglutide alone. In September 2025, Eli Lilly terminated a phase IIb study investigating a tirzepatide-bimagrumab combination in obese and type II diabetic patients. As of March 2026, a third phase IIb study of tirzepatide and bimagrumab in combination is ongoing.
