= STEAP1 =

Protein-coding gene in the species Homo sapiens

Identifiers
- Aliases: STEAP1, PRSS24, STEAP, six transmembrane epithelial antigen of the prostate 1, STEAP family member 1
- External IDs: OMIM: 604415; MGI: 1917608; GeneCards: STEAP1

Gene location (Human)
Chr.	Chromosome 7 (human)
Band	7q21.13	Start	90,154,456 bp
Band	7q21.13	End	90,164,829 bp

Gene location (Mouse)
Chr.	Chromosome 5 (mouse)
Band	5 A1|5 3.2 cM	Start	5,786,317 bp
Band	5 A1|5 3.2 cM	End	5,799,326 bp
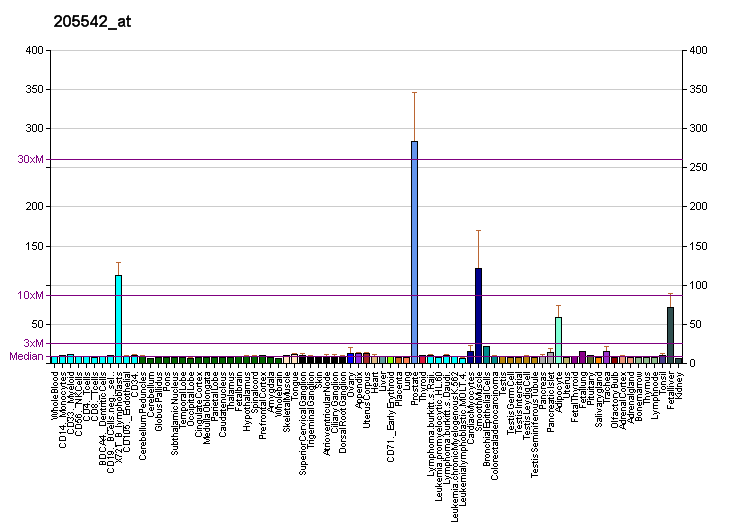
RNA expression pattern
Bgee	Human / Mouse (ortholog); Top expressed in: pericardium; cartilage tissue; prostate; tendon of biceps brachii; Achilles tendon; parietal pleura; gonad; mucosa of transverse colon; abdominal fat; gallbladder / Top expressed in: Epithelium of choroid plexus; endothelial cell of lymphatic vessel; lumbar spinal ganglion; epithelium of lens; molar; hair follicle; yolk sac; adrenal gland; Paneth cell; iris; More reference expression data
BioGPS	More reference expression data
Gene ontology
Molecular function	ferric-chelate reductase (NADPH) activity; metal ion binding; transporter activity; oxidoreductase activity; cupric reductase activity; channel activity
Cellular component	endosome membrane; integral component of membrane; cell-cell junction; integral component of plasma membrane; membrane; endosome; plasma membrane
Biological process	ion transport; copper ion import; iron ion homeostasis; transmembrane transport; iron ion import across cell outer membrane
Sources:Amigo / QuickGO
Orthologs
Databases	NCBI: entry; OMA: entry
Species	Human	Mouse
Entrez	26872	70358
Ensembl	ENSG00000164647	ENSMUSG00000015652
UniProt	Q9UHE8	Q9CWR7
RefSeq (mRNA)	NM_012449	NM_027399
RefSeq (protein)	NP_036581	NP_081675
Location (UCSC)	Chr 7: 90.15 – 90.16 Mb	Chr 5: 5.79 – 5.8 Mb
PubMed search
- Wikidata
View/Edit Human	View/Edit Mouse

Metalloreductase STEAP1 is an enzyme that in humans is encoded by the STEAP1 gene.

This gene is predominantly expressed in prostate tissue, and is found to be upregulated in multiple cancer cell lines. The gene product is predicted to be a six-transmembrane protein, and was shown to be a cell surface antigen significantly expressed at cell-cell junctions.
