= Lumiliximab =

Monoclonal antibody

Monoclonal antibody
- Type: Whole antibody
- Source: Chimeric (primate/human)
- Target: CD23

Clinical data
- ATC code: none

Identifiers
- CAS Number: 357613-86-6
- DrugBank: DB06162
- ChemSpider: none
- UNII: 8Z13S29R5A

Chemical and physical data
- Formula: C_{2115}H_{3252}N_{556}O_{673}S_{16}
- Molar mass: 47749.46 g·mol^{−1}

Lumiliximab is an IgG1k monoclonal antibody that targets CD23. It acts as an immunomodulator and was awarded orphan drug status and fast track designation by the FDA.

It was investigated in Phase II/III clinical trials for the treatment of chronic lymphocytic leukemia. It has also been studied for use in allergic asthma. The drug is a chimeric antibody from Macaca irus and Homo sapiens.

Lumiliximab was developed by IDEC Pharmaceuticals, which was acquired by Biogen. Clinical trials for CLL were terminated in 2010, and for allergic asthma in 2007. Results published from the CLL clinical trial failed to meet primary endpoints.
