= Stamulumab =

Monoclonal antibody

Monoclonal antibody
- Type: Whole antibody
- Source: Human
- Target: myostatin

Clinical data
- Routes of administration: injection only
- ATC code: none

Identifiers
- CAS Number: 705287-60-1
- ChemSpider: none
- UNII: V43X8G4797
- KEGG: D05917

Chemical and physical data
- Formula: C_{6330}H_{9748}N_{1672}O_{1668}S_{48}
- Molar mass: 137500.53 g·mol^{−1}

Stamulumab (MYO-029) is an experimental myostatin inhibiting drug developed by Wyeth Pharmaceuticals for the treatment of muscular dystrophy (MD). Stamulumab was formulated and tested by Wyeth in Collegeville, Pennsylvania. Myostatin is a protein that inhibits the growth of muscle tissue, stamulumab is a recombinant human antibody designed to bind to and inhibit the activity of myostatin.

Stamulumab is a G1 immunoglobulin antibody which binds to myostatin and prevents it from binding to its target site, thus inhibiting the growth-limiting action of myostatin on muscle tissue. Research completed in 2002 found that Stamulumab might one day prove to be an effective treatment for Duchenne muscular dystrophy.

== Phase 1 and 2 trials ==
Wyeth undertook a Phase 1 and 2 clinical trial in 2005 and 2006 of stamulumab. The multiple ascending dose trial (36 patients per cohort) contained some measures of efficacy. The trial's participants included people afflicted with facioscapulohumeral muscular dystrophy, Becker's muscular dystrophy, and Limb-girdle muscular dystrophy. Through 2007 Wyeth had been analyzing the results but the hoped-for news and/or a publication in 2007 did not occur. On January 24, 2008, Wyeth announced that the study had been accepted by a peer-reviewed journal and publication was expected "in the next few months". The publication appeared in Annals of Neurology in May 2008.

On 11 March 2008, it was announced that Wyeth would not develop the drug further for MD, but would continue to explore myostatin inhibition along with other strategies.

== See also ==
- ACVR2B represents an alternative approach to inhibiting myostatin. Not belonging to the antibody class of molecules, the ACVR2B protein drug is rather mimicking myostatin's endogenous binding partner, therefore competing for its binding affinity.
