= Domagrozumab =

Monoclonal antibody

Monoclonal antibody
- Type: Whole antibody
- Source: Humanized (from mouse)
- Target: GDF-8

Clinical data
- Other names: PF-06252616
- ATC code: none

Identifiers
- CAS Number: 1629605-31-7
- ChemSpider: none
- UNII: 516MD5WQ24
- KEGG: D11047

Chemical and physical data
- Formula: C_{6366}H_{9826}N_{1690}O_{2008}S_{46}
- Molar mass: 143639.22 g·mol^{−1}

Domagrozumab (PF-06252616) (INN) is a humanized monoclonal antibody designed for the treatment of Duchenne muscular dystrophy.

This drug was developed by Pfizer. Pfizer stopped development in 2018 after disappointing results in 2 human trials.
