= MST1R =

Protein-coding gene in humans

Identifiers
- Aliases: MST1R, CD136, CDw136, PTK8, RON, macrophage stimulating 1 receptor, NPCA3, SEA
- External IDs: OMIM: 600168; MGI: 99614; GeneCards: MST1R
Available structures
PDB	Ortholog search: PDBe RCSB
PDB	List of PDB id codes 3PLS, 4FWW, 4QT8
Enzyme activity
EC #	BRENDA	ExPASy	KEGG	MetaCyc
2.7.10.1	↗	↗	↗	↗

Gene location (Human)
Chr.	Chromosome 3 (human)
Band	3p21.31	Start	49,887,002 bp
Band	3p21.31	End	49,903,873 bp

Gene location (Mouse)
Chr.	Chromosome 9 (mouse)
Band	9 59.07 cM|9 F1	Start	107,784,072 bp
Band	9 59.07 cM|9 F1	End	107,797,582 bp
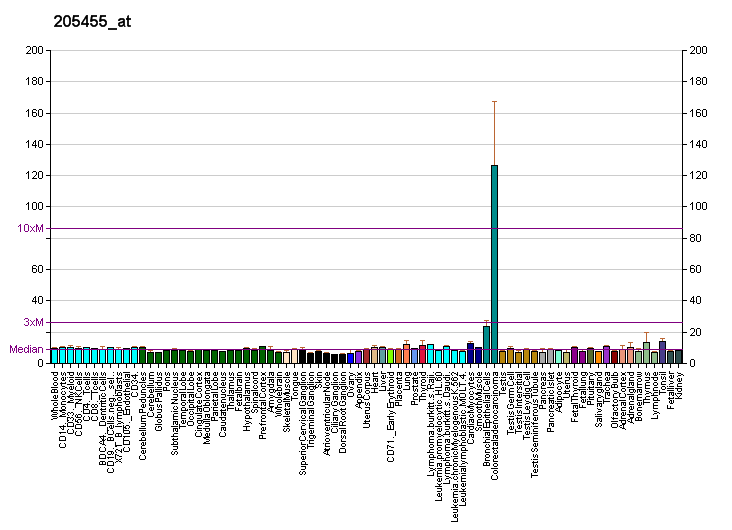
RNA expression pattern
Bgee	Human / Mouse (ortholog); Top expressed in: mucosa of transverse colon; skin of leg; skin of abdomen; rectum; body of stomach; mucosa of ileum; gallbladder; gastric mucosa; upper lobe of left lung; testicle / Top expressed in: lip; epithelium of stomach; duodenum; intestinal villus; Ileal epithelium; large intestine; colon; jejunum; mucous cell of stomach; esophagus; More reference expression data
BioGPS	More reference expression data
Gene ontology
Molecular function	transferase activity; nucleotide binding; protein kinase activity; macrophage colony-stimulating factor receptor activity; kinase activity; protein binding; enzyme binding; transmembrane receptor protein tyrosine kinase activity; protein tyrosine kinase activity; ATP binding; Wnt-protein binding
Cellular component	integral component of membrane; membrane; integral component of plasma membrane; stress fiber; cell surface; vacuole; plasma membrane; receptor complex
Biological process	defense response; positive regulation of protein kinase B signaling; positive regulation of MAP kinase activity; phosphorylation; transmembrane receptor protein tyrosine kinase signaling pathway; immune system process; single fertilization; protein phosphorylation; positive regulation of cell population proliferation; peptidyl-tyrosine phosphorylation; innate immune response; signal transduction; macrophage colony-stimulating factor signaling pathway; hepatocyte growth factor receptor signaling pathway; response to virus; Wnt signaling pathway
Sources:Amigo / QuickGO
Orthologs
Databases	NCBI: entry; OMA: entry
Species	Human	Mouse
Entrez	4486	19882
Ensembl	ENSG00000164078	ENSMUSG00000032584
UniProt	Q04912	Q62190
RefSeq (mRNA)	NM_001244937; NM_002447; NM_001318913	NM_001287261; NM_009074
RefSeq (protein)	NP_001231866; NP_001305842; NP_002438	NP_001274190; NP_033100
Location (UCSC)	Chr 3: 49.89 – 49.9 Mb	Chr 9: 107.78 – 107.8 Mb
PubMed search
- Wikidata
View/Edit Human	View/Edit Mouse

Macrophage-stimulating protein receptor is a protein that in humans is encoded by the MST1R gene. This protein functions as a cell membrane receptor for macrophage-stimulating protein (MST1).

MST1R is also known as RON (Recepteur d'Origine Nantais) kinase, named after the French city in which it was discovered. It is related to the c-MET receptor tyrosine kinase.

== Interactions ==
MST1R has been shown to interact with Grb2.
