= Garetosmab =

Monoclonal antibody

Monoclonal antibody
- Type: ?
- Target: Activin A

Clinical data
- Trade names: Pasatru
- Other names: REGN-2477, garetosmab-grts
- AHFS/Drugs.com: Pasatru
- License data: US DailyMed: Garetosmab
- Routes of administration: Intravenous
- ATC code: None

Legal status
- Legal status: US: ℞-only

Identifiers
- CAS Number: 2097125-54-5
- DrugBank: DB16379
- UNII: KR9ZSKO5QE
- KEGG: D11443
- ChEMBL: ChEMBL4298176

Garetosmab, sold under the brand name Pasatru, is a fully human, IgG4 monoclonal antibody used for the treatment of fibrodysplasia ossificans progressiva. It is an activin signaling inhibitor against activin-A.

The most common side effects include nosebleeds, increased hair growth, abscess, and acne.

Garetosmab was approved for medical use in the United States in August 2026.

== Medical uses ==
Garetosmab is indicated to reduce formation of new heterotopic ossification lesions and clinician-assessed flare-ups in adults with fibrodysplasia ossificans progressiva.

Fibrodysplasia ossificans progressiva is a rare genetic disease caused by a mutation in activin A receptor-type 1, which controls new bone growth. As a result, connective tissues such as muscle, tendons and ligaments gradually turn into bone, causing limited movement, deformities, severe disability, and early death.

== Adverse effects ==
Garetosmab has a warning for fetal harm when administered during pregnancy.

== History ==
The effectiveness and safety of garetosmab were evaluated in a randomized, double-blind, placebo-controlled clinical study of 63 adults with fibrodysplasia ossificans progressiva. Participants received garetosmab 3 mg/kg, garetosmab 10 mg/kg, or placebo, each given by intravenous infusion every 4 weeks for 56 weeks. After the initial 56 weeks, 61 participants continued in an extended follow-up phase on the same treatment.

== Society and culture ==
=== Legal status ===
Garetosmab was approved for medical use in the United States in August 2026. The US Food and Drug Administration (FDA) granted the application for garetosmab breakthrough therapy, fast track, orphan drug, and priority review designations. The FDA granted the approval of Pasatru to Regeneron Pharmaceuticals.

=== Names ===
Garetosmab is the international nonproprietary name.

Garetosmab is sold under the brand name Pasatru.
