= CD37 =

Mammalian protein found in humans

Identifiers
- Aliases: CD37, GP52-40, TSPAN26, CD37 molecule
- External IDs: OMIM: 151523; MGI: 88330; GeneCards: CD37

Gene location (Human)
Chr.	Chromosome 19 (human)
Band	19q13.33	Start	49,335,171 bp
Band	19q13.33	End	49,343,335 bp

Gene location (Mouse)
Chr.	Chromosome 7 (mouse)
Band	7 B3|7 29.2 cM	Start	44,883,056 bp
Band	7 B3|7 29.2 cM	End	44,888,539 bp
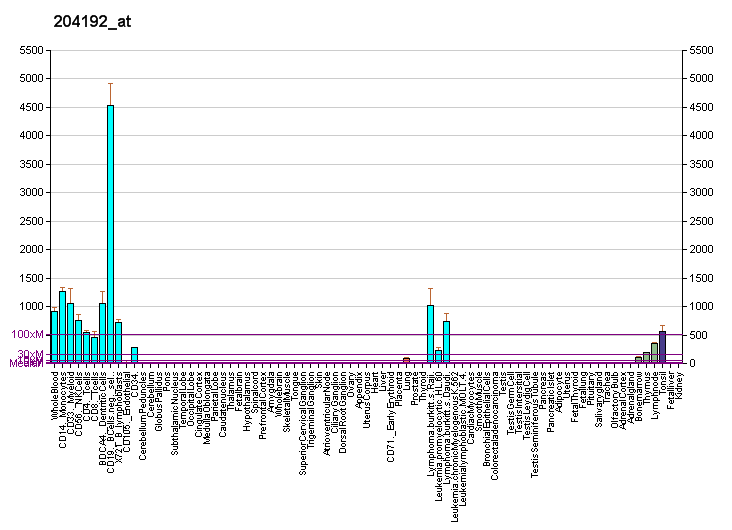
RNA expression pattern
Bgee	Human / Mouse (ortholog); Top expressed in: granulocyte; monocyte; spleen; appendix; bone marrow cell; blood; lymph node; right lung; gallbladder; upper lobe of left lung / Top expressed in: granulocyte; mesenteric lymph nodes; spleen; blood; tibiofemoral joint; thymus; stroma of bone marrow; subcutaneous adipose tissue; white adipose tissue; embryo; More reference expression data
BioGPS	More reference expression data
Gene ontology
Molecular function	protein binding
Cellular component	integral component of membrane; integral component of plasma membrane; extracellular exosome; membrane; immunological synapse
Biological process	cell surface receptor signaling pathway
Sources:Amigo / QuickGO
Orthologs
Databases	NCBI: entry; OMA: entry
Species	Human	Mouse
Entrez	951	12493
Ensembl	ENSG00000104894	ENSMUSG00000030798
UniProt	P11049	Q61470
RefSeq (mRNA)	NM_001040031; NM_001774	NM_007645; NM_001290802; NM_001290804
RefSeq (protein)	NP_001035120; NP_001765	NP_001277731; NP_001277733; NP_031671
Location (UCSC)	Chr 19: 49.34 – 49.34 Mb	Chr 7: 44.88 – 44.89 Mb
PubMed search
- Wikidata
View/Edit Human	View/Edit Mouse

Leukocyte antigen CD37 is a protein that in humans is encoded by the CD37 gene.

== Function ==
The protein encoded by this gene is a member of the transmembrane 4 superfamily, also known as the tetraspanin family. Most of these members are cell-surface proteins that are characterized by the presence of four hydrophobic transmembrane domains. Tetraspanins mediate signal transduction events that play a role in the regulation of immune responses, cell development, activation, growth and motility. CD37 expression is restricted to cells of the immune system, with highest abundance on mature B cells, and lower expression is found on T cells and myeloid cells. CD37 is a cell surface glycoprotein that is known to complex with integrins and other transmembrane 4 superfamily proteins. Alternate splicing results in multiple transcript variants encoding different isoforms. CD37 controls both humoral and cellular immune responses. CD37-deficiency in mice leads to spontaneous development on B cell lymphoma, and patients with CD37-negative lymphomas have a worse clinical outcome.

== See also ==
- Cluster of differentiation
