= Single-chain variable fragment =

Fragment

Rotating scFv fragment with highlighted complementarity determining regions (CDRs)

The two possible structures of a single-chain variable fragment, with the antigen binding sites including the N-termini on the left and the C-termini on the right. The linker peptides are shown as arrows.

A single-chain variable fragment (scFv) is not actually a fragment of an antibody, but instead is a fusion protein of the variable regions of the heavy (V_{H}) and light chains (V_{L}) of immunoglobulins, connected with a short peptide linker of ten to about 25 amino acids.

Each variable fragment contains framework regions (FWRs), providing stability to the structure, and complementarity-determining regions (CDRs), which are the regions responsible for antigen recognition.

The linker is usually rich in glycine, which provides flexibility, as well as serine or threonine, that provides solubility. The peptide linker can either connect the N-terminus of the V_{H} with the C-terminus of the V_{L}, or vice versa, but changes in the orientation of the V_{H}, peptide linker and V_{L} have been described to affect scFv’s affinity and specificity.

This protein retains the specificity of the original immunoglobulin, despite removal of the constant regions and the introduction of the linker. The image to the right shows how this modification usually leaves the specificity unaltered.

These molecules were created to facilitate phage display, where it is highly convenient to express the antigen-binding domain as a single peptide. As an alternative, scFv can be created directly from subcloned heavy and light chains derived from a hybridoma. ScFvs have many uses, e.g., flow cytometry, immunohistochemistry, and as antigen-binding domains of CAR-T cells.

Unlike monoclonal antibodies, which are often produced in mammalian cell cultures, scFvs are more often produced in bacteria cell cultures such as E. coli.

== Purification ==
Single-chain variable fragments lack the constant Fc region found in complete antibody molecules, and, thus, the common binding sites (e.g., protein G) cannot be used to purify antibodies. These fragments can often be purified or immobilized using protein L, since protein L interacts with the variable region of kappa light chains. More commonly, scientists incorporate a six histidine tag on the c-terminus of the scFv molecule and purify them using immobilized metal affinity chromatography (IMAC). Some scFv can also be captured by protein A if they contain a human VH3 domain.

== Bivalent and trivalent scFvs ==
Structure of divalent (top) and trivalent (bottom) scFvs, tandem (left) and di-/trimerisation format (right)

Divalent (or bivalent) single-chain variable fragments (di-scFvs, bi-scFvs) can be engineered by linking two scFvs. This can be done by producing a single peptide chain with two V_{H} and two V_{L} regions, yielding tandem scFvs. Another possibility is the creation of scFvs with linker peptides that are too short for the two variable regions to fold together (about five amino acids), forcing scFvs to dimerize. This type is known as diabodies. Diabodies have been shown to have dissociation constants up to 40-fold lower than corresponding scFvs, meaning that they have a much higher affinity to their target. Consequently, diabody drugs could be dosed much lower than other therapeutic antibodies and are capable of highly specific targeting of tumors in vivo. Still shorter linkers (one or two amino acids) lead to the formation of trimers, so-called triabodies or tribodies. Tetrabodies have also been produced. They exhibit an even higher affinity to their targets than diabodies.

All of these formats can be composed from variable fragments with specificity for two different antigens, in which case they are types of bispecific antibodies. The furthest developed of these are bispecific tandem di-scFvs, known as bi-specific T-cell engagers (BiTE antibody constructs).

== Examples ==
- Pexelizumab, a scFv binding to component 5 of the complement system and designed to reduce side effects of cardiac surgery
- C6.5, a diabody targeting HER2/neu found in some breast cancers
- Brolucizumab, a scFV binding to VEGF-A and used to treat wet age-related macular degeneration
- G6A, a scFV binding to human Hsp70.1 and can be used to target this protein as a potential marker in vast cancers.
