= Seagen =

American biotechnology company

Seagen Inc.
- Formerly: Seattle Genetics, Inc. (1997–2020)
- Type: Subsidiary
- Traded as: Nasdaq: SGEN
- Industry: Biotechnology, pharmaceutical
- Founded: 1997; 29 years ago
- Headquarters: Bothell, Washington, U.S.
- Key people: David R. Epstein; (Chief Executive Officer); Roger Dansey M.D.; (President, Research and Development); Todd E. Simpson; (Chief Financial Officer)
- Products: Brentuximab vedotin and other antibody-drug conjugates
- Revenue: ▲US$1.96 billion (2022)
- Operating income: ▲US$−613 million (2022)
- Net income: ▲US$−610 million (2022)
- Total assets: ▼US$3.67 billion (2022)
- Total equity: ▼US$2.80 billion (2022)
- Number of employees: 3,256 (2022)
- Parent: Pfizer
- Website: seagen.com

Seagen Inc. (formerly Seattle Genetics, Inc.) is an American biotechnology company focused on developing and commercializing innovative, empowered monoclonal antibody-based therapies for the treatment of cancer. The company, headquartered in Bothell, Washington (a suburb of Seattle), was considered the industry leader in antibody-drug conjugates or ADCs, a technology designed to harness the targeting ability of monoclonal antibodies to deliver cell-killing agents directly to cancer cells, with its development of drugs such as Adcetris, Padcev, and Tivdak. Antibody-drug conjugates are intended to spare non-targeted cells and thus reduce many of the toxic effects of traditional chemotherapy, while potentially enhancing antitumor activity.

The company's flagship product Adcetris (brentuximab vedotin) is commercially available for four indications in more than 65 countries, including the U.S., Canada, Japan and members of the European Union.

To expand on the clinical opportunities of brentuximab vedotin, Seattle Genetics is conducting a broad clinical development program to evaluate its therapeutic potential in earlier lines of its approved indications as well as in a range of other lymphoma and non-lymphoma settings. The company is jointly developing brentuximab vedotin in collaboration with Takeda Pharmaceutical Company. Under the terms of the collaboration, Seattle Genetics has full commercialization rights to brentuximab vedotin in the United States and Canada. Takeda has exclusive rights to commercialize the product candidate in all other countries.

In addition to brentuximab vedotin, Seattle Genetics' product pipeline includes enfortumab vedotin, being co-developed with Astellas Pharma, tisotumab vedotin, being co-developed with Genmab, SGN-LIV1A, an ADC targeting LIV-1, and several immuno-oncology agents in phase 1 studies.

In January 2018, the company announced it would acquire Cascadian Therapeutics for $614 million.

In September 2020, Merck & Co announced it would purchase $1 billion of Seagen's common stock, with both companies co-developing lead treatment: ladiratuzumab vedotin.

In November 2022, the company announced the appointment of David R. Epstein as Chief Executive Officer and Director.

Pfizer agreed to acquire Seagen in March 2023 at an enterprise value of $43 billion.

== Collaboration agreements ==
Seattle Genetics has collaboration agreements with Takeda Oncology Company (formerly Millennium) to develop and commercialize brentuximab vedotin. The company also has collaboration agreements for their ADC technology with a number of biotechnology and pharmaceutical companies, including AbbVie, Bayer Celldex Therapeutics, Inc., Daiichi Sankyo, Genentech, Inc., GlaxoSmithKline, Pfizer, Inc., and PSMA Development Company LLC, as well as ADC co-development agreements with Agensys, Inc., an affiliate of Astellas Pharma, and Oxford BioTherapeutics Ltd.

== Technology ==
=== MMAE-based ===
Seattle Genetics' proprietary monomethyl auristatin E or MMAE-based antibody-drug conjugate technology, employed in brentuximab vedotin, empowers monoclonal antibodies to treat cancer. Brentuximab vedotin, for example, links the chimeric anti-CD30 monoclonal antibody (cAC10) via a protease-cleavable linker to MMAE. This ADC employs a linker system that is designed to be stable in the bloodstream but to release MMAE upon internalization into CD30-expressing tumor cells. This approach is intended to spare non-targeted (healthy) cells and thus reduce many of the toxic effects of traditional chemotherapy while potentially enhancing antitumor activity. (See also vedotins)

== History ==
=== Early years ===
Seattle Genetics was founded in 1997, by Henry Perry Fell, Jr. and Clay Siegall, and is headquartered in Bothell, Washington, a suburb of Seattle. The company completed an initial public offering in March 2001, and prior to its acquisition by Pfizer, it was traded on the Nasdaq Stock Market under the symbol SGEN, and was a component of the Nasdaq-100. As of December 2016, the company has more than 900 employees throughout the United States.

=== 2009 ===
19 February: pivotal trial for brentuximab vedotin for Hodgkin lymphoma
18 June: Phase II trial of brentuximab vedotin for anaplastic large cell lymphoma
24 July: initiation of re-treatment clinical trial of brentuximab vedotin
10 August: milestone achievement in collaboration with MedImmune through initiation of Phase I clinical trial of MEDI-547.
8 September: milestone achievement in collaboration with Bayer for the submission of investigational new drug application with the FDA
5 October: discontinuation of Phase IIb trial with dazcetuzumab (also known as SGN-40 or huS2C6) for the treatment of diffuse large B-cell lymphoma
16 November: initiation of Phase I clinical trial for SGN-75 (INN: vorsetuzumab mafodotin)
11 December: termination of collaboration with Genentech for SGN-40
21 December: announcement of new collaboration with GlaxoSmithKline ($12 million up front payment, up to $390 million in milestone payments)

In 2009, when it appeared that ADCETRIS could reach the market, the company realized that commercial skills would need to be grown in-house and/or acquired. This led to a decision to grow a commercial team to address the United States and Canadian markets, and a marketing collaboration with Takeda to cover the rest of the world. By 2018, however, the company was confident it could conduct a global commercialization venture.

=== 2010 ===
2 February: initiation of phase I combination clinical trial of brentuximab vedotin (SGN-35) for Hodgkin lymphoma
3 March: milestone achievement under collaboration with Genentech
8 April: initiation of Phase III trial for brentuximab vedotin (SGN-35) for post transplant Hodgkin lymphoma
20 April: $9.5 million payment from Genentech to extend collaboration
20 July: initiation of Phase I clinical trial of ASG-5ME for treatment of pancreatic cancer
3 August: expansion of collaboration with Genentech ($12 million upfront payment, up to $900 million in potential fees and milestone payments)
2 September: milestone achievement in collaboration with Agensys for initiation of Phase I trial of AGS-16M8F
14 September: entry into collaboration with Genmab
20 October: initiation of Phase I clinical trial of ASG-5ME in prostate cancer treatment

=== 2011 ===
6 January: entry into collaboration with Pfizer ($8 million upfront payment, $200+ million in potential milestone payments)
1 March: initiation of Phase I clinical trial of brentuximab vedotin for use in conjunction with chemotherapy for treatment of systemic anaplastic large cell lymphoma
15 March: expansion of collaboration with the Millennium Pharmaceuticals (Takeda Oncology)
22 March: announcement of collaboration with Abbott ($8 million upfront payment, plus potential royalties and milestone payments)
11 April: James Fan, SG manager of clinical programming, commits suicide one day after being indicted for insider trading in Seattle Genetics securities
19 April: expansion of collaboration with Genmab
19 August accelerated FDA approval for brentuximab vedotin for use in treatment of Hodgkin lymphoma and systemic anaplastic large cell lymphoma (ALCL)
23 August: initiation of Phase II trial of ADCETRIS in CD30-positive non-Hodgkin lymphoma
9 September: collaboration with Oxford BioTherapeutics
25 October: initiation of Phase II clinical trial of ADCETRIS in CD30-positive non-lymphoma malignancies

=== 2012 ===
4 June: interim Phase I data from ASG-5ME in prostate cancer
5 July: initiation of global Phase III trial of ADCETRIS against CD30-expressing cutaneous T-cell lymphoma
24 August: initiation of Phase Ib trial of SGN-75 (INN: vorsetuzumab mafodotin) for use in combination with everolimus in patients with renal cell carcinoma
9 October: milestone achievement under collaboration with Genentech by advancements of two antibody conjugates into Phase II trials
17 October: initiation of Phase II trial of ADCETRIS in age 60+ Hodgkin lymphoma patients
23 October: expansion of collaboration with Abbott (upfront payment of $25 million, milestone payment up to $220 million)
1 November: initiation of global Phase III trial of ADCETRIS in untreated advanced Hodgkin lymphoma patients
26 November: received orphan drug designation for ADCETRIS treatment of mycosis fungoides

=== 2013 ===
1 February: Health Canada approves ADCETRIS for treatment of relapsed refractory Hodgkin lymphoma
6 February: initiation of two Phase I trials of SGN-CD19A
25 June: new collaboration with Bayer
15 July: initiation of Phase I trial of SGN-CD33A in treatment of acute myeloid leukemia (AML)
15 August: initiation of Phase II trial of ADCETRIS for diffuse large B-cell lymphoma
21 October: initiation of Phase I trial of SGN-LIV1A for patients with LIV-1-positive metastatic breast cancer

=== 2014 ===
29 September: brentuximab vedotin was successfully used as a consolidation therapy in a late-stage trial for patients with a type of lymphatic cancer.
8 December: Data of Brentuximab Vedotin in Diffuse Large B-cell Lymphoma presented at the Annual Meeting of the American Society of Hematology

=== 2015 ===
12 January: clinical collaboration with Bristol-Myers Squibb to evaluate combination of brentuximab vedotin and nivolumab in hematologic malignancies
18 February: Supplemental Biologics License Application (BLA) for Brentuximab Vedotin in Post-Transplant Hodgkin Lymphoma Patients at High Risk of Relapse
8 June: collaboration with Unum Therapeutics to develop and commercialise its new antibody-coupled T-cell receptor (ACTR) therapies for cancer, generating up to $645 million for Unum.
31 December: Adcetris sales increase to $226 million.

=== 2016 ===
For the year: the company was at the bottom of the Annual Top 25 Biotech Companies for the year as judged by staff of Genetic Engineering & Biotechnology News.
28 March: the company announces it will develop 12 more drugs, employing another 100 staff.

=== 2020 ===
The company announced its corporate name change to Seagen Inc.

=== 2022 ===
In July the press reported Merck & Co. was in advanced talks to acquire Seagen Inc. and was aiming to finalize a purchase of the cancer biotech in the next few weeks, according to people familiar with the matter, in a deal that could be worth roughly $40 billion or more. The expected sellout is expected to materialize in the month of August 2022 with some delay due to Merck being set to report its fiscal second-quarter earnings on July 28.

=== 2023 ===
In March 2023, Pfizer agreed to acquire Seagen for a total enterprise value of around $43 billion. The acquisition includes the FDA approved medicines Adcetris for lymphomas, Padcev for bladder cancers, Tivdak for cervical cancer and Tukysa for breast and colorectal cancers as well as Seagen's drug development pipeline.

Pfizer later announced that it would abandon its plans to build a large manufacturing facility in Everett, Washington, which was scheduled to open in 2024.

== Product portfolio and pipeline ==
- ADCETRIS: used in the treatment of Hodgkin lymphoma and systemic anaplastic large cell lymphoma.
- SGN-75 (INN: vorsetuzumab mafodotin: a humanized IgG1 monoclonal antibody conjugated via a non-cleavable maleimidocaproyl (mc) linker with monomethyl auristatin F (MMAF), used in Phase I trial of relapsed or refractory renal cell carcinoma patients or non-Hodgkin lymphoma patients.
- ASG-5ME: product candidate for the treatment of solid tumours (targets SLC44A4 in pancreatic, prostate and gastric cancer).
- Enfortumab vedotin (aka ASG-22ME, formerly ASG-22M6E): product candidate for the treatment of solid tumours (targets Nectin-4 in bladder, breast, lung and pancreatic cancer); developed in 50-50 partnership with Astellas
- SGN-CD19A: product candidate for the treatment of hematologic malignancies
