= CD33 =

Mammalian protein found in humans

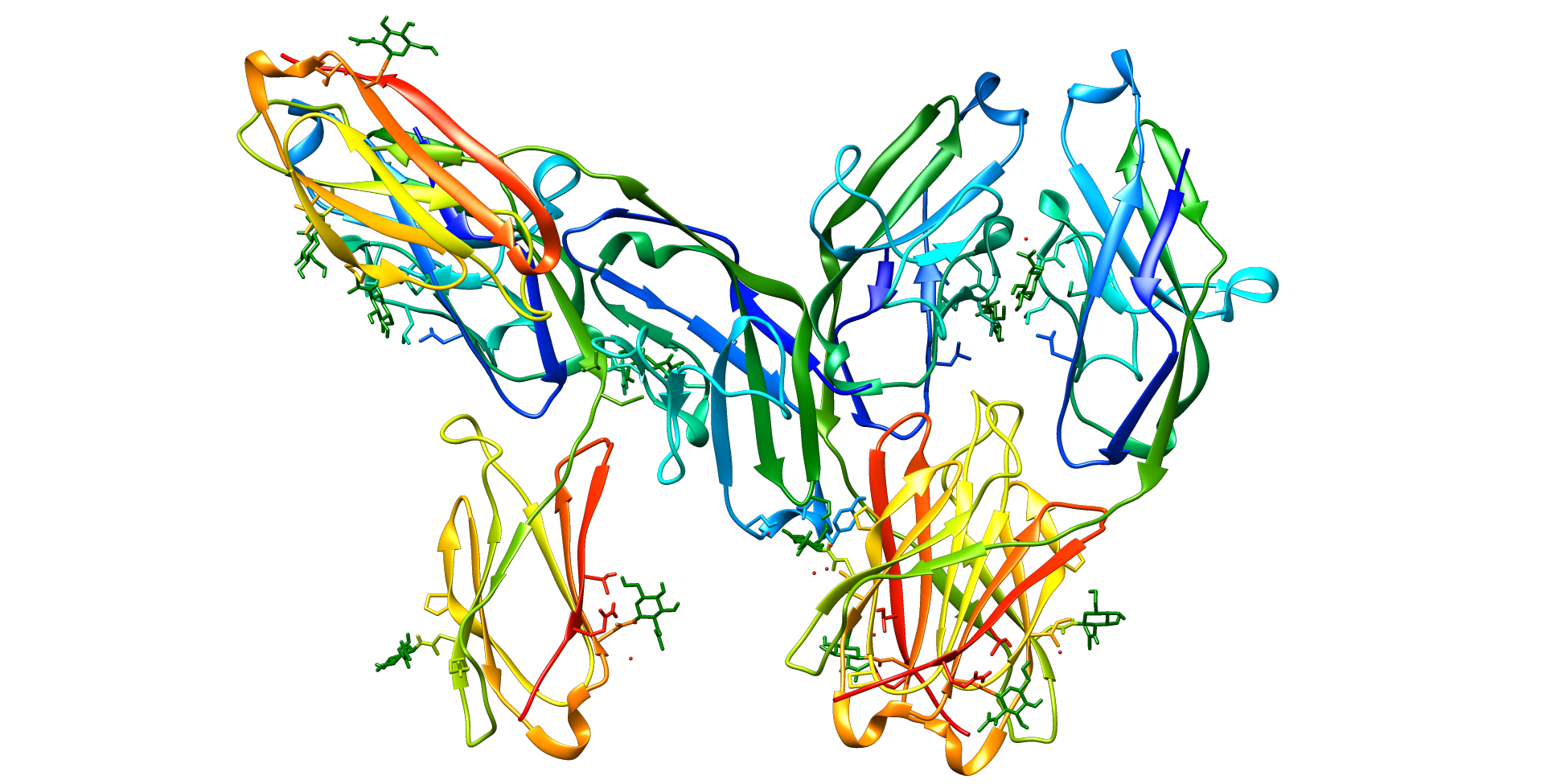

Identifiers
- Aliases: CD33, CD33 molecule, SIGLEC-3, SIGLEC3, p67
- External IDs: OMIM: 159590; MGI: 99440; GeneCards: CD33
Available structures
PDB	Ortholog search: PDBe RCSB
PDB	List of PDB id codes 5IHB, 5J06, 5J0B, 6D48, 6D49, 6D4A, 6TL8, 7AW6

Gene location (Human)
Chr.	Chromosome 19 (human)
Band	19q13.41	Start	51,225,064 bp
Band	19q13.41	End	51,243,860 bp

Gene location (Mouse)
Chr.	Chromosome 7 (mouse)
Band	7 B3|7 28.25 cM	Start	43,173,640 bp
Band	7 B3|7 28.25 cM	End	43,193,852 bp
RNA expression pattern
Bgee	Human / Mouse (ortholog); Top expressed in: monocyte; granulocyte; spleen; blood; bone marrow cell; right coronary artery; upper lobe of left lung; right lung; appendix; right adrenal cortex / Top expressed in: granulocyte; stroma of bone marrow; lumbar subsegment of spinal cord; blood; tibiofemoral joint; gastrula; submandibular gland; calvaria; spleen; superior frontal gyrus; More reference expression data
BioGPS	n/a
Gene ontology
Molecular function	protein binding; carbohydrate binding; signaling receptor activity; protein phosphatase binding; sialic acid binding
Cellular component	integral component of membrane; integral component of plasma membrane; membrane; external side of plasma membrane; nucleus; plasma membrane; specific granule membrane; tertiary granule membrane; peroxisome; Golgi apparatus
Biological process	cell-cell signaling; cell adhesion; signal transduction; negative regulation of cell population proliferation; regulation of immune response; neutrophil degranulation; immune response-inhibiting signal transduction; positive regulation of protein secretion; negative regulation of interleukin-1 beta production; negative regulation of interleukin-8 production; negative regulation of tumor necrosis factor production; negative regulation of calcium ion transport; cell-cell adhesion; positive regulation of protein tyrosine phosphatase activity; negative regulation of monocyte activation
Sources:Amigo / QuickGO
Orthologs
Databases	NCBI: entry; OMA: entry
Species	Human	Mouse
Entrez	945	12489
Ensembl	ENSG00000105383	ENSMUSG00000004609
UniProt	P20138	Q63994
RefSeq (mRNA)	NM_001082618; NM_001177608; NM_001772	NM_001111058; NM_021293
RefSeq (protein)	NP_001076087; NP_001171079; NP_001763	NP_001104528; NP_067268
Location (UCSC)	Chr 19: 51.23 – 51.24 Mb	Chr 7: 43.17 – 43.19 Mb
PubMed search
- Wikidata
View/Edit Human	View/Edit Mouse

CD33 or Siglec-3 (sialic acid binding Ig-like lectin 3, SIGLEC3, SIGLEC-3, gp67, p67) is a transmembrane receptor expressed on cells of myeloid lineage. It is usually considered myeloid-specific, but it can also be found on some lymphoid cells.

It binds sialic acids, therefore is a member of the SIGLEC family of lectins.

== Structure ==
The extracellular portion of this receptor contains two immunoglobulin domains (one IgV and one IgC2 domain), placing CD33 within the immunoglobulin superfamily. The intracellular portion of CD33 contains immunoreceptor tyrosine-based inhibitory motifs (ITIMs) that are implicated in inhibition of cellular activity.

== Function ==
CD33 can be stimulated by any molecule with sialic acid residues such as glycoproteins or glycolipids. Upon binding, the immunoreceptor tyrosine-based inhibition motif (ITIM) of CD33, present on the cytosolic portion of the protein, is phosphorylated and acts as a docking site for Src homology 2 (SH2) domain-containing proteins like SHP phosphatases. This results in a cascade that inhibits phagocytosis in the cell.

== Alzheimer's disease ==
CD33 controls microglial activation but in Alzheimer disease it goes overdrive in presence of amyloid and tau proteins, its expression is known to be tied to TREM2.

== Clinical significance ==
CD33 is the target of gemtuzumab ozogamicin (trade name: Mylotarg®; Pfizer/Wyeth-Ayerst Laboratories), an antibody-drug conjugate (ADC) for the treatment of patients with acute myeloid leukemia. The drug is a recombinant, humanized anti-CD33 monoclonal antibody (IgG4 κ antibody hP67.6) covalently attached to the cytotoxic antitumor antibiotic calicheamicin (N-acetyl-γ-calicheamicin) via a bifunctional linker (4-(4-acetylphenoxy)butanoic acid). Several mechanisms of resistance to gemtuzumab ozogamicin have been elucidated. On September 1, 2017, the FDA approved Pfizer's Mylotarg.

Gemtuzumab ozogamicin was initially approved by the U.S. Food and Drug Administration in 2000. However, during post marketing clinical trials researchers noticed a greater number of deaths in the group of patients who received gemtuzumab ozogamicin compared with those receiving chemotherapy alone. Based on these results, Pfizer voluntarily withdrew gemtuzumab ozogamicin from the market in mid-2010, but was reintroduced to the market in 2017.

CD33 is also the target in vadastuximab talirine (SGN-CD33A), a novel antibody-drug conjugate being developed by Seattle Genetics, utilizing this company's ADC technology.
