= Disitamab vedotin =

Pharmaceutical drug

Clinical data
- Trade names: Aidixi

Legal status
- Legal status: Rx in China

Identifiers
- CAS Number: 2136633-23-1
- PubChem SID: 472420323
- UNII: RB3U3A1S27
- KEGG: D12989
- ChEMBL: ChEMBL5095273

Disitamab vedotin (trade name Aidixi) is a drug for the treatment of various types of solid tumors. It is an antibody-drug conjugate that consists of an immunoglobulin G1 antibody that is linked to the antitumor agent vedotin (monomethyl auristatin E).

== History ==
In the United States, the FDA has granted disitamab vedotin a breakthrough therapy designation for the treatment of patients with HER2-positive locally advanced or metastatic urothelial carcinoma following treatment with platinum-based chemotherapy.
