= Vadastuximab talirine =

Chemical compound

Monoclonal antibody
- Type: Whole antibody
- Source: Chimeric (mouse/human)
- Target: CD33

Clinical data
- Other names: SGN-CD33A
- ATC code: none

Identifiers
- CAS Number: 1436390-64-5
- ChemSpider: none
- UNII: T13V17U431

Vadastuximab talirine is an antibody-drug conjugate (ADC) directed to CD33 (siglec-3) which is a transmembrane receptor expressed on cells of myeloid lineage. The experimental drug, being developed by Seattle Genetics, was in clinical trials for the treatment of acute myeloid leukemia (AML).

Development of vadastuximab talirine was discontinued in 2017 after a pivotal phase III clinical trial.

== Target, mAb, linker, and cytotoxin ==
The drug target, CD33, is expressed on most AML cells. The CD33 antibody is attached to a highly potent DNA binding agent, a pyrrolobenzodiazepine (PBD) dimer (SGD-1882), via a proprietary site-specific conjugation chemistry via a cleavable (valine-alanine dipeptide as cathepsin B cleavage site) maleimidocaproyl type linker, to a monoclonal antibody with engineered cysteines (EC-mAb). Vadastuximab talirine contains two site-specific drug attachment engineered cysteines. This use of engineered cysteine residues at the sites of drug linker attachment results in a drug loading of approximately 2 PBD dimers per antibody. PBD dimers are significantly more potent than systemic chemotherapeutic drugs and the site-specific conjugation technology (EC-mAb) allows uniform drug-loading of the cell-killing PBD agent to the anti-CD33 antibody.

== Clinical trials ==
The drug has concluded phase I clinical trials for acute myeloid leukemia. Interim results were presented in Dec 2014. and published April 2015.

Based on interim data from ongoing phase I clinical trials presented at the 57th Annual Meeting of the American Society of Hematology (ASH), researchers at Seattle Genetics have planned a phase III clinical trial to begin in 2016. This phase III study is expected to evaluate vadastuximab talirine in combination with hypomethylating agents (HMAs; azacitidine, decitabine) in previously untreated older AML patients. The drug is also being evaluated broadly across multiple lines of therapy in patients with myeloid malignancies, including in ongoing and planned phase I and II clinical trials for newly diagnosed or relapsed AML and for newly diagnosed myelodysplastic syndrome or MDS.

A phase III clinical trial of Vadastuximab talirine in combination with hypomethylating agents, was terminated, however, in June 2017 due to a higher rate of deaths resulting from fatal infections.

== Orphan drug designation ==
Vadastuximab talirine was granted orphan drug designation by both the U.S. Food and Drug Administration (FDA) and the European Commission for the treatment of AML.
