= Ozogamicin =

Complex antibody-drug conjugate

Identifiers
- IUPAC name: methyl(1R,4Z,8S,13E )-13-[2-[[2-[[[p-(3-carbamoylpropoxy)-α-methylbenzylidene]hydrazino]carbonyl]-1,1-dimethylethyl]dithio]ethylidene]-8-[[4,6-dideoxy-4-[[[2,6-dideoxy-4-S-[4-[(6-deoxy-3-O-methyl-α-L-mannopyranosyl)oxy]-3-iodo-5,6-dimethoxy-o-toluoyl]-4-thio-β-D-ribo-hexopyranosyl]oxy]amino]-2-O-[2,4-dideoxy-4-(N-ethylacetamido)-3-O-methyl-α-L-threo-pentopyranosyl]-β-D-glucopyranosyl]oxy]-1-hydroxy-11-oxobicyclo[7.3.1]trideca-4,9-diene-2,6-diyne-10-carbamate
- CAS Number: 400046-53-9
- UNII: EDM24GA51F
- CompTox Dashboard (EPA): DTXSID001350185

Chemical and physical data
- Formula: C_{73}H_{97}IN_{6}O_{25}S_{3}
- Molar mass: 1681.68 g·mol^{−1}
- 3D model (JSmol): Interactive image
- SMILES: CCN(C1COC(CC1OC)OC2C(C(C(OC2OC3C#CC=CC#CC4(CC(=O)C(=C3C4=CCSSC(C)(C)CC(=O)NN=C(C)C5=CC=C(C=C5)OCCCC(=O)N)NC(=O)OC)O)C)NOC6CC(C(C(O6)C)SC(=O)C7=C(C(=C(C(=C7OC)OC)OC8C(C(C(C(O8)C)O)OC)O)I)C)O)O)C(=O)C
- InChI: InChI=1S/C73H97IN6O25S3/c1-15-80(41(7)81)45-35-98-52(32-49(45)92-10)103-65-60(87)57(79-105-53-31-46(82)67(40(6)99-53)107-68(89)54-36(2)56(74)63(66(95-13)62(54)93-11)104-69-61(88)64(94-12)59(86)39(5)101-69)38(4)100-70(65)102-48-21-18-16-17-19-28-73(91)33-47(83)58(76-71(90)96-14)55(48)44(73)27-30-106-108-72(8,9)34-51(85)78-77-37(3)42-23-25-43(26-24-42)97-29-20-22-50(75)84/h16-17,23-27,38-40,45-46,48-49,52-53,57,59-61,64-65,67,69-70,79,82,86-88,91H,15,20,22,29-35H2,1-14H3,(H2,75,84)(H,76,90)(H,78,85)/b17-16-,44-27+,77-37+/t38-,39+,40-,45+,46+,48+,49+,52+,53+,57-,59+,60+,61-,64-,65-,67-,69+,70+,73+/m1/s1; Key:HNMATTJJEPZZMM-BPKVFSPJSA-N

The term ozogamicin in the names of monoclonal antibodies or antibody-drug conjugates indicates that they are linked to a cytotoxic agent from the class of calicheamicins.

== See also ==
- Gemtuzumab ozogamicin
- Inotuzumab ozogamicin
