= CD70 =

Mammalian protein found in humans

Identifiers
- Aliases: CD70, CD70 molecule, CD27L, CD27LG, TNFSF7, TNLG8A, CD27-L, LPFS3
- External IDs: OMIM: 602840; MGI: 1195273; GeneCards: CD70

Gene location (Human)
| Chr. | Chromosome 19 (human) |
| Band | 19p13.3 | Start | 6,583,183 bp |
| Band | 19p13.3 | End | 6,604,103 bp |

Gene location (Mouse)
| Chr. | Chromosome 17 (mouse) |
| Band | 17 D|17 29.69 cM | Start | 57,452,997 bp |
| Band | 17 D|17 29.69 cM | End | 57,456,777 bp |
RNA expression pattern
| Bgee | Human / Mouse (ortholog); Top expressed in: cartilage tissue; buccal mucosa cell; paraflocculus of cerebellum; lymph node; spleen; appendix; blood; gonad; synovial membrane; granulocyte / Top expressed in: embryo; Meckel's cartilage; embryo; lesser wing of sphenoid bone; humerus; axial skeleton; rib; cerebellar cortex; shoulder; bones of pectoral girdle; More reference expression data |
| BioGPS | n/a |
Gene ontology
| Molecular function | protease binding; signaling receptor binding; tumor necrosis factor receptor binding; cytokine activity; protein binding |
| Cellular component | extracellular exosome; membrane; integral component of membrane; integral component of plasma membrane; plasma membrane; extracellular space |
| Biological process | tumor necrosis factor-mediated signaling pathway; cell population proliferation; extrinsic apoptotic signaling pathway; signal transduction; cell-cell signaling; immune response; regulation of signaling receptor activity; positive regulation of T cell proliferation |
Sources:Amigo / QuickGO
Orthologs
| Databases | NCBI: entry; OMA: entry |
| Species | Human | Mouse |
| Entrez | 970 | 21948 |
| Ensembl | ENSG00000125726 | ENSMUSG00000019489 |
| UniProt | P32970 | O55237 |
| RefSeq (mRNA) | NM_001252; NM_001330332 | NM_011617 |
| RefSeq (protein) | NP_001243; NP_001317261 | NP_035747 |
| Location (UCSC) | Chr 19: 6.58 – 6.6 Mb | Chr 17: 57.45 – 57.46 Mb |
| PubMed search |
- Wikidata
| View/Edit Human | View/Edit Mouse |

CD70 (Cluster of Differentiation 70) is a protein that in humans is encoded by CD70 gene. CD70 is also known as a ligand for CD27.

== Expression ==
In physiological condition the expression of CD70 on immune cells is transient and tightly controlled. It is primarily expressed on highly activated T cells and B cells, as well as on NK cells and mature dendritic cells. CD70 expression on T and B cells is stimulated through triggering of T and B cell receptors and can be upregulated by cytokines such as IL-1α, IL-2, IL-12, GM-CSF and TNF-α, while IL-4 and IL-10 can decrease CD70 expression. Expression of CD70 on mDCs and pDCs is induced with Toll-like receptor (TLR) triggering and CD40 ligation. Also, CD70 can be induced on NK cells upon stimulation with IL-15.

== Functions ==
CD70 acts as a costimulatory molecule and plays an important role in the regulation of the immune system activation, specifically by improving T-cell and B-cell activation, proliferation and survival, leading to a more efficient immune response.

CD70 on activated antigen presenting cells (APC) including dendritic cells and B cells binds to CD27 on T lymphocytes and provides costimulatory signals. The interaction between CD27 and CD70 leads to the recruitment of intracellular adaptor proteins, such as TRAF2 and TRAF5, which then activate signaling pathways, including the NF-κB and JNK pathway. CD27 signaling stimulates naïve CD4+ T lymphocytes to differentiate into Th1 cells by activation the transcription factor T-bet.

In addition to its role in T-cell activation and proliferation, CD70 also plays a role in the regulation of B-cell activation and differentiation. Receptor engagement can also cause reverse signaling through CD70. CD70 reverse signaling activates the phosphatidylinositol-3 kinase (PI3K) and MAP kinase signaling pathways, leading to the activation of various transcription factors and the expression of genes involved in cell growth and survival.

== Clinical significance ==
=== Cancer ===
Some studies have shown that CD70 is overexpressed in several types of cancer, including Hodgkin's lymphoma and non-Hodgkin's lymphoma. CD70 is also found to be overexpressed in some types of solid tumors. This overexpression of CD70 in cancer cells has been shown to promote cell proliferation and survival, and to inhibit apoptosis, leading to the development and progression of the cancer. It is therefore suggested that anti-CD70 antibodies might be a possible treatment for CD70 positive lymphomas as normal lymphocytes have low CD70 expression.

== Drug development ==
Recent research has focused on the potential therapeutic use of CD70 in cancer treatment. One strategy being investigated is the use of antibodies that target CD70. ARGX-110 is a CD70-specific antibody that is currently under investigation for the treatment of hematological malignancies. It is being developed by the Belgian company arGEN-X. In December 2013 a first part of a phase 1b trial was completed. In January 2014 a safety and efficacy phase of the study started.

Vorsetuzumab mafodotin is a CD70-targeted antibody-drug conjugate that started clinical trials for renal cell carcinoma.

== See also ==
- Cluster of differentiation
