= Vorsetuzumab mafodotin =

Chemical compound

Monoclonal antibody
- Type: ?
- Source: Humanized (from mouse)
- Target: CD70

Clinical data
- Other names: SGN-75
- ATC code: none

Legal status
- Legal status: Discontinued

Identifiers
- CAS Number: 1165741-01-4
- ChemSpider: none
- UNII: 699619YVTQ
- KEGG: D10341

Chemical and physical data
- Formula: C_{6476}H_{10006}N_{1726}O_{2028}S_{50}(C_{49}H_{78}N_{6}O_{11})_{3-5}
- Molar mass: 150 kg/mol

Vorsetuzumab mafodotin (SGN-75) is an antibody-drug conjugate (ADC) directed to the protein CD70 designed for the treatment of cancer. It is a humanized monoclonal antibody, vorsetuzumab, conjugated with noncleavable monomethyl auristatin F (MMAF), a cytotoxic agent.

This drug was developed by Seattle Genetics, Inc. The drug completed phase I clinical trials for renal cell carcinoma, but development was discontinued in 2013. No reason was given but SG plan to start clinical trials of SGN-CD70A in 2014.
