= Indusatumab vedotin =

Pharmaceutical drug

Monoclonal antibody
- Type: Whole antibody
- Source: Human
- Target: Guanylate cyclase 2C

Clinical data
- Other names: MLN-0264, 5F9vcMMAE
- Routes of administration: Intravenous
- ATC code: none

Legal status
- Legal status: Experimental

Identifiers
- CAS Number: 1514889-12-3
- ChemSpider: none
- UNII: 3F0FR4W3H8

Chemical and physical data
- Molar mass: ~150 kg/mol

Indusatumab vedotin (MLN-0264) is an antibody-drug conjugate that is under development for the treatment of pancreatic cancer and other gastrointestinal cancers. It consists of a monoclonal antibody (indusatumab) that targets the enzyme guanylate cyclase 2C which is present in some cancers, linked to an average of three to four molecules of the chemotherapeutic agent monomethyl auristatin E (MMAE).

It was in Phase II clinical trials as of February 2016. The trials were terminated in 2017 because of insufficient efficacy.
