= Denintuzumab mafodotin =

Pharmaceutical drug

Monoclonal antibody
- Type: Whole antibody
- Source: Humanized (from mouse)
- Target: CD19

Clinical data
- Other names: SGN-19A
- ATC code: none

Identifiers
- CAS Number: 1399672-02-6
- ChemSpider: none
- UNII: H5324S1M7H
- KEGG: D11232

Denintuzumab mafodotin (INN; development codes SGN-19A or SGN-CD19A) is a humanized monoclonal antibody-drug conjugate designed for the treatment of CD19-positive acute lymphoblastic leukemia and B-cell non-Hodgkin lymphoma. It consists of an anti-CD19 mAb linked to monomethyl auristatin F (MMAF), a cytotoxic agent. This drug was developed by Seattle Genetics.

Denintuzumab refers to the anti-CD19 antibody, and mafodotin refers to MMAF and the chemical linkage.

== Clinical trials ==
The drug is in phase I clinical trials. Preliminary phase I results for B-cell malignancies, including diffuse large B-cell lymphoma (DLBCL) and B-lineage acute lymphocytic leukemia (B-ALL) were presented at the ASH medical conference Dec 2015.

=== Phase 2 ===
A separate randomized phase 2 trial started in 2015 to evaluate SGN-CD19A in combination with R-ICE chemotherapy for second-line DLBCL. A phase 2 clinical trial in front-line DLBCL is started in 2016. Both trials were terminated by the sponsor based on portfolio prioritization.
