= Oncomatryx =

Pharmaceutical company

Oncomatryx Biopharma S. L. is a pharmaceutical biotechnology company that develops personalized treatments against invasive cancer as well as tests for its early detection. Established by Laureano Simón, PhD, Oncomatryx thus engages twofold in the fight against invasive kinds of cancer, such as pancreatic cancer or invasive breast cancer, all of which have high mortality rates.

Oncomatryx's research focuses on peritumoral stroma, which has been found to take part in promoting cancer invasiveness and curtailing treatment efficacy.

== Laureano Simón ==
Laureano Simón began his business career in 2000 with the creation of Progenika Biopharma S.A., a personalized medicine company which was acquired by Grifols in February 2013.

Dr. Simón holds a Ph.D. in Chemical Sciences (Molecular Biology) by the Universidad Autónoma de Madrid, a master's degree in Biotechnology by the University of Navarra, an MSc by the “University of Wisconsin-Madison” and a bachelor's degree in Pharmacy by the University of Santiago de Compostela. He has patented, among others, clinical products such as BLOODchip and LIPOchip.

== Research and development ==
The company bases its R&D on the recent discovery that tumor cells generate changes in the cells that surround them as well as in the extracellular matrix, facilitating invasion metastases. Oncomatryx and its collaborators and advisors have proved that peritumoral stroma, which is constituted by mesenchymal cells and extracellular matrix, plays a key role in tumor invasiveness and metastasis, at the same time being a physical barrier that prevents anti-cancer agents from reaching tumor cells.

Oncomatryx is developing a new generation of biological anti-tumor drugs, combining cytotoxic molecules and monoclonal antibodies specifically directed towards tumor associated stroma.

=== Scientific Advisory Board ===
- Franco Dosio, Ph.D. Professor, Department of Drug Science and Technology. Università degli Studi di Torino. Torino, Italy.
- Tomás Girbés, Ph.D. Professor. Department of Nutrition and Bromatology. Facultad de Medicina. Universidad de Valladolid, CINAD. Valladolid, Spain.
- Manuel Hidalgo, M.D., Ph.D. Head of Gastrointestinal Cancer Clinical Research unit. Centro Nacional de Investigaciones Oncológicas. Madrid, Spain.
- Roland E. Kontermann, Ph.D. Mildred-Scheel Professor. Biomedical Engineering unit. Institut für Zellbiologie und Immunologie. Universität Stuttgart. Germany.
- Klaus Pfizenmaier, Ph.D. Professor, Director of Institute. Cell Biology unit. Institut für Zellbiologie und Immunologie. Universität Stuttgart. Germany.
- Andrea Bolognesi, Phd. Professor. Department of Experimental Diagnosticand Speciality Medicine. Universitá Bologna, Italy.

=== Collaborations ===
Oncomatryx collaborates with the Institut für Zell Biologie und Immunologie of the University of Stuttgart, the University of Valladolid, Hospital Universitario Marqués de Valdecilla, Hospital Universitario Central de Asturias, the Centro Nacional de Investigaciones Oncológicas, National Jewish Health and Breast Cancer Research among others.

== Developments and products of the company ==
=== Diagnostic tests ===
Currently, invasive cancer is associated with a very short life expectancy . In the case of pancreatic cancer, which unfortunately is almost always already in invasive stages at the time of diagnosis, only between 1% and 4% of patients survive for five years after diagnosis.

Oncomatryx has developed molecular diagnostic tests to predict the invasiveness of breast tumors (DMTXbreastScan) and pancreas, colon, lung, and head and neck tumors (DMTXinvaScan). These tests have already been used successfully in hospitals in Andalucia, Asturias, Cantabria, Catalonia, Galicia, Madrid, Navarre, the Basque Country and Valencia in Spain. In addition, the universities of Columbia (USA), Munich (Germany) and Copenhagen (Denmark) have also proven their high sensitivity and specificity. DMTXinvaScan and DMTXbreastScan were presented to the international medical community at the Annual Conference of the United States and Canadian Academy of Pathology, held in Baltimore, USA, in March 2013. Specifically, DMTXbreastScan helps to determine, at the moment of first diagnosis, if a breast tumor has the capacity to develop metastases. This test, which is already being used in USA hospitals such as Johns Hopkins Hospital in Baltimore and Cedars Sinai Hospital in Los Angeles, has 93.5% sensitivity and 94.2% specificity in detecting invasive breast tumors in biopsies. In addition, it helps to predict if a benign lesion of the breast, such as a papilloma, will turn into a malignant tumor, so the treatment can be adapted more effectively for each patient.

=== Antitumor treatments ===
Antitumor drugs developed by Oncomatryx, which specifically target the peritumoral stroma, are currently in pre-clinical development phase and will enter clinical trials in 2015. For this purpose, the company has reached an agreement with the U.S. National Jewish Health hospital and Case Western Reserve University whereby Oncomatyx will use a human protein, Cystatin-C, as a principle asset for the development of drugs against invasive breast cancer.

Oncomatryx has also signed collaboration agreements with the Universität Stuttgart (Germany), the Universidad de Valladolid (Spain), and other biotech companies for the development of immunotoxins and ADCs targeted specifically towards the stromal component of tumors. This strategy allows for attacking directly the cells responsible for invasion and metastasis in cancer. These immunotoxins and ADCs are specifically directed against two proteins, known as MTX1 and MTX2, which are expressed only in the peritumoral stroma that surround the tumor and facilitates its progression and metastasis.
