= Lifastuzumab vedotin =

Pharmaceutical drug

Monoclonal antibody
- Type: ?
- Source: Humanized (from mouse)
- Target: phosphate-sodium cotransporter

Clinical data
- Other names: DNIB0600A
- ATC code: none

Identifiers
- CAS Number: 1401812-88-1
- ChemSpider: none
- UNII: 7IUT83FK6S
- KEGG: D11238

Chemical and physical data
- Formula: C_{6504}H_{10028}N_{1744}O_{2018}S_{46}
- Molar mass: 146416.72 g·mol^{−1}

Lifastuzumab vedotin (INN; development code DNIB0600A) is an experimental monoclonal antibody-drug conjugate designed for the treatment of cancer.

This drug was developed by Genentech/Roche.
