= Dacetuzumab =

Monoclonal antibody

Monoclonal antibody
- Type: Whole antibody
- Source: Humanized (from mouse)
- Target: CD40

Clinical data
- Other names: SGN-40
- ATC code: none

Identifiers
- CAS Number: 880486-59-9
- ChemSpider: none
- UNII: UT59FF4T5X

Chemical and physical data
- Formula: C_{6452}H_{9964}N_{1732}O_{1998}S_{42}
- Molar mass: 145111.33 g·mol^{−1}

Dacetuzumab (also known as SGN-40 or huS2C6) is a humanized monoclonal antibody being developed for the treatment of CD40-positive cancers like non-Hodgkin's lymphoma and hematological malignancies.

This drug was developed by Seattle Genetics, Inc.
