= Pyrrolobenzodiazepine =

Medical compound

Anthramycin contains pyrrolobenzodiazepine core

Pyrrolobenzodiazepines, (PBD) are a class of compound that may have antibiotic or anti-tumor properties.

Some dimeric pyrrolobenzodiazepines are used as the cytotoxic drug payloads in antibody-drug conjugates, for example in loncastuximab tesirine.

== History ==
Anthramycin, the first PBD monomer, was first synthesized in the 1960s.
