= Monomethyl auristatin E =

Names
- IUPAC name (S)-N-((3R,4S,5S)-1-((S)-2-((1R,2R)-3-(((1S,2R)-1-hydroxy-1-phenylpropan-2-yl)amino)-1-methoxy-2-methyl-3-oxopropyl)pyrrolidin-1-yl)-3-methoxy-5-methyl-1-oxoheptan-4-yl)-N,3-dimethyl-2-((S)-3-methyl-2-(methylamino)butanamido)butanamide
- Other names Monomethylauristatin E

Identifiers
CAS Number	474645-27-7
3D model (JSmol)	Interactive image
Abbreviations	MMAE
ChemSpider	9716967
ECHA InfoCard	100.241.825
KEGG	D09691
PubChem CID	11542188
UNII	V7I58RC5EJ
CompTox Dashboard (EPA)	DTXSID101028844
- InChI: InChI=1S/C39H67N5O7/c1-13-25(6)34(43(10)39(49)33(24(4)5)42-38(48)32(40-9)23(2)3)30(50-11)22-31(45)44-21-17-20-29(44)36(51-12)26(7)37(47)41-27(8)35(46)28-18-15-14-16-19-28/h14-16,18-19,23-27,29-30,32-36,40,46H,13,17,20-22H2,1-12H3,(H,41,47)(H,42,48)/t25-,26+,27+,29-,30+,32-,33-,34-,35+,36+/m0/s1 Key: DASWEROEPLKSEI-UIJRFTGLSA-N; InChI=1/C39H67N5O7/c1-13-25(6)34(43(10)39(49)33(24(4)5)42-38(48)32(40-9)23(2)3)30(50-11)22-31(45)44-21-17-20-29(44)36(51-12)26(7)37(47)41-27(8)35(46)28-18-15-14-16-19-28/h14-16,18-19,23-27,29-30,32-36,40,46H,13,17,20-22H2,1-12H3,(H,41,47)(H,42,48)/t25-,26+,27+,29-,30+,32-,33-,34-,35+,36+/m0/s1 Key: DASWEROEPLKSEI-UIJRFTGLBD
- SMILES: CO[C@H]([C@H](C(N[C@@H]([C@H](C1=CC=CC=C1)O)C)=O)C)[C@@]2([H])N(C(C[C@H]([C@H]([C@H](CC)C)N(C)C([C@H](C(C)C)NC([C@@H](NC)C(C)C)=O)=O)OC)=O)CCC2

Properties
Chemical formula	C_{39}H_{67}N_{5}O_{7}
Molar mass	717.993 g·mol^{−1}
- Except where otherwise noted, data are given for materials in their standard state (at 25 °C [77 °F], 100 kPa). verify (what is ?) Infobox references

Monomethyl auristatin E (MMAE) is a synthetic antineoplastic agent. Because of its toxicity, it cannot be used as a drug itself; instead, it is linked to a monoclonal antibody (MAB) which directs it to the cancer cells. In International Nonproprietary Names for MMAE-MAB-conjugates, the name vedotin refers to MMAE plus its linking structure to the antibody. It is a potent antimitotic drug derived from peptides occurring in marine shell-less mollusc Dolabella auricularia called dolastatins which show potent activity in preclinical studies, both in vitro and in vivo, against a range of lymphomas, leukemia and solid tumors. These drugs show potency of up to 200 times that of vinblastine, another antimitotic drug used for Hodgkin lymphoma as well as other types of cancer.

MMAE is actually desmethyl-auristatin E; that is, the N-terminal amino group has only one methyl substituent instead of two as in auristatin E itself.

== Mechanism of action ==
Monomethyl auristatin E is an antimitotic agent which inhibits cell division by blocking the polymerisation of tubulin. The linker to the monoclonal antibody is stable in extracellular fluid, but is cleaved by cathepsin once the conjugate has entered a tumor cell, thus activating the antimitotic mechanism.

Structure of a MMAE-MAB-conjugate. The linker, consisting of the amino acids valine (Val) and citrulline (Cit), is cleaved by cathepsin inside tumour cells. The spacer (para-aminobenzylcarbamate) is marked green, the cathepsin-cleavable linker is blue, and the attachment group (consisting of maleimide and caproic acid) is brown. The whole radical inside the four boxes is called vedotin.

== Monoclonal antibodies/ADCs ==
MMAE has been tested with various monoclonal antibodies (usually forming an antibody-drug conjugate).

- targeting the protein CD30 which is found on malignant cells in anaplastic large cell lymphoma and Hodgkin's lymphoma:
  - Brentuximab (cAC10), 3–5 units of MMAE per molecule
- targeting the glycoprotein GPNMB which is found in aggressive melanoma, glioma, breast cancer and other tumours:
  - Glembatumumab (CR011, CDX-011), investigated for the treatment of breast cancer and melanoma
- targeting CD37:
  - AGS67E, to treat lymphoid malignancy
- targeting tissue factor in recurrent or persistent cervical cancers that progress on or after first line chemotherapy regimens:
  - tisotumab vedotin

Examples:

- Sofituzumab vedotin
- Polatuzumab vedotin (RG7596)
- Enfortumab vedotin
- Pinatuzumab vedotin
- Lifastuzumab vedotin
- Brentuximab vedotin
- Glembatumumab vedotin
- Tisotumab vedotin
- Indusatumab vedotin (MLN-0264) in phase II trials

== See also ==
- Seattle Genetics
- Monomethyl auristatin F
