= TNFRSF4 =

Protein-coding gene in humans

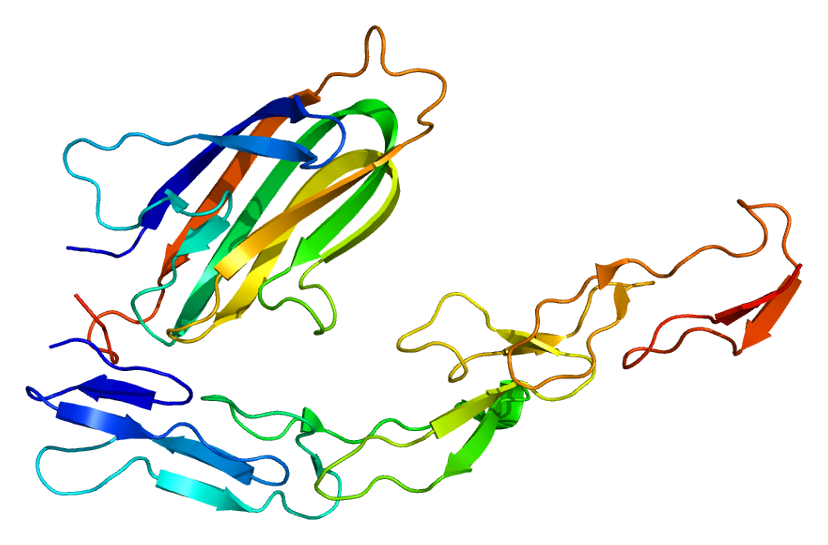

Identifiers
- Aliases: TNFRSF4, ACT35, CD134, IMD16, OX40, TXGP1L, tumor necrosis factor receptor superfamily member 4, TNF receptor superfamily member 4
- External IDs: OMIM: 600315; MGI: 104512; GeneCards: TNFRSF4
Available structures
PDB	Ortholog search: PDBe RCSB
PDB	List of PDB id codes 1D0A, 2HEV, 2HEY

Gene location (Human)
Chr.	Chromosome 1 (human)
Band	1p36.33	Start	1,211,340 bp
Band	1p36.33	End	1,214,153 bp
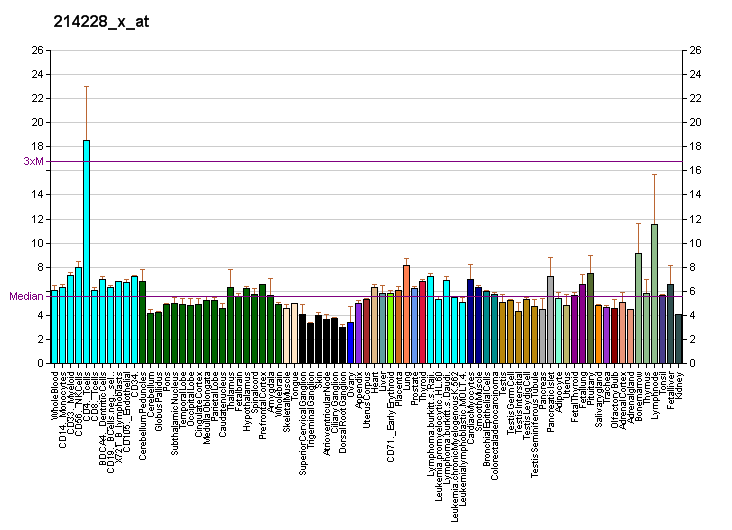
RNA expression pattern
Bgee	Human / Mouse (ortholog); Top expressed in: apex of heart; granulocyte; gonad; spleen; lymph node; cartilage tissue; mucosa of transverse colon; upper lobe of left lung; blood; appendix / n/a; More reference expression data
BioGPS	More reference expression data
Gene ontology
Molecular function	virus receptor activity; tumor necrosis factor-activated receptor activity; protein binding
Cellular component	integral component of membrane; membrane; plasma membrane; integral component of plasma membrane; cell surface; external side of plasma membrane
Biological process	regulation of apoptotic process; tumor necrosis factor-mediated signaling pathway; negative regulation of DNA-binding transcription factor activity; multicellular organism development; T cell proliferation; response to lipopolysaccharide; regulation of cell population proliferation; positive regulation of B cell proliferation; immune response; apoptotic signaling pathway; viral entry into host cell; inflammatory response; negative regulation of transcription, DNA-templated; viral process; cellular defense response; regulation of protein kinase activity; negative regulation of activation-induced cell death of T cells; negative regulation of extrinsic apoptotic signaling pathway
Sources:Amigo / QuickGO
Orthologs
Databases	NCBI: entry; OMA: entry
Species	Human	Mouse
Entrez	7293	22163
Ensembl	ENSG00000186827	n/a
UniProt	P43489	P47741
RefSeq (mRNA)	NM_003327	NM_011659
RefSeq (protein)	NP_003318	NP_035789
Location (UCSC)	Chr 1: 1.21 – 1.21 Mb	n/a
PubMed search
- Wikidata
View/Edit Human	View/Edit Mouse

Tumor necrosis factor receptor superfamily, member 4 (TNFRSF4), also known as CD134 and OX40 receptor, is a member of the TNFR-superfamily of receptors which is not constitutively expressed on resting naïve T cells, unlike CD28. OX40 is a secondary co-stimulatory immune checkpoint molecule, expressed after 24 to 72 hours following activation; its ligand, OX40L, is also not expressed on resting antigen presenting cells, but is following their activation. Expression of OX40 is dependent on full activation of the T cell; without CD28, expression of OX40 is delayed and of fourfold lower levels.

== Function ==
OX40 has no effect on the proliferative abilities of CD4+ cells for the first three days, however after this time proliferation begins to slow and cells die at a greater rate, due to an inability to maintain a high level of PKB activity and expression of Bcl-2, Bcl-XL and survivin. OX40L binds to OX40 receptors on T-cells, preventing them from dying and subsequently increasing cytokine production. OX40 has a critical role in the maintenance of an immune response beyond the first few days and onwards to a memory response due to its ability to enhance survival. OX40 also plays a crucial role in both Th1 and Th2 mediated reactions in vivo.

OX40 binds TRAF2, 3 and 5 as well as PI3K by an unknown mechanism. TRAF2 is required for survival via NF-κB and memory cell generation whereas TRAF5 seems to have a more negative or modulatory role, as knockouts have higher levels of cytokines and are more susceptible to Th2-mediated inflammation. TRAF3 may play a critical role in OX40-mediated signal transduction. CTLA-4 is down-regulated following OX40 engagement in vivo and the OX40-specific TRAF3 DN defect was partially overcome by CTLA-4 blockade in vivo. TRAF3 may be linked to OX40-mediated memory T cell expansion and survival, and point to the down-regulation of CTLA-4 as a possible control element to enhance early T cell expansion through OX40 signaling.

== Clinical significance ==
OX40 has been implicated in the pathologic cytokine storm associated with certain viral infections, including the H5N1 bird flu.

== As a drug or drug target ==
An artificially created biologic fusion protein, OX40-immunoglobulin (OX40-Ig), prevents OX40 from reaching the T-cell receptors, thus reducing the T-cell response. Experiments in mice have demonstrated that OX40-Ig can reduce the symptoms associated with the cytokine storm (an immune overreaction) while allowing the immune system to fight off the virus successfully.

An anti-OX40 antibody GSK3174998 has started clinical trials as a cancer treatment. Research in mice has included the combination of an agonistic OX40 antibody (clone OX86) injected directly into a tumor in combination with an unmethylated CpG oligonucleotide, which as a TLR9 ligand activates expression of OX40 so that it can be affected.

== Interactions ==
CD134 has been shown to interact with TRAF5 and TRAF2.
