= OX40 ligand =

Protein found in humans

TNFSF4

Identifiers
- Aliases: TNFSF4, CD134L, CD252, GP34, OX-40L, OX4OL, TXGP1, TNLG2B, tumor necrosis factor superfamily member 4, TNF superfamily member 4
- External IDs: OMIM: 603594; MGI: 104511; GeneCards: TNFSF4
Available structures
PDB	Ortholog search: PDBe RCSB
PDB	List of PDB id codes 2HEV

Gene location (Human)
Chr.	Chromosome 1 (human)
Band	1q25.1	Start	173,183,731 bp
Band	1q25.1	End	173,207,331 bp

Gene location (Mouse)
Chr.	Chromosome 1 (mouse)
Band	1 H2.1|1 69.75 cM	Start	161,222,980 bp
Band	1 H2.1|1 69.75 cM	End	161,245,981 bp
RNA expression pattern
Bgee	Human / Mouse (ortholog); Top expressed in: gonad; monocyte; stromal cell of endometrium; endothelial cell; gastric mucosa; testicle; granulocyte; blood; islet of Langerhans; appendix / Top expressed in: scapula; embryo; Meckel's cartilage; humerus; fibula; sphenoid bone; rib; basisphenoid; radius; gastrula; More reference expression data
BioGPS	n/a
Gene ontology
Molecular function	cytokine activity; tumor necrosis factor receptor binding; signaling receptor binding; protein binding; tumor necrosis factor receptor superfamily binding
Cellular component	integral component of membrane; membrane; plasma membrane; integral component of plasma membrane; extracellular space; cell surface
Biological process	positive regulation of inflammatory response; tumor necrosis factor-mediated signaling pathway; cellular response to prostaglandin E stimulus; immune response; positive regulation of T cell proliferation; positive regulation of cell population proliferation; negative regulation of interleukin-17 production; cellular response to lipopolysaccharide; signal transduction; regulation of signaling receptor activity; defense response to nematode; acute inflammatory response; positive regulation of T cell cytokine production; regulation of adaptive immune response; positive regulation of type 2 immune response; positive regulation of immunoglobulin mediated immune response; response to virus; negative regulation of interferon-gamma production; positive regulation of interferon-gamma production; positive regulation of interleukin-10 production; positive regulation of interleukin-12 production; positive regulation of interleukin-13 production; positive regulation of interleukin-4 production; positive regulation of interleukin-6 production; memory T cell activation; T-helper 2 cell activation; response to nitrogen dioxide; positive regulation of CD4-positive, alpha-beta T cell differentiation; positive regulation of memory T cell differentiation; negative regulation of DNA-binding transcription factor activity; negative regulation of regulatory T cell differentiation; negative regulation of T-helper 1 cell differentiation; positive regulation of T-helper 2 cell differentiation; negative regulation of transcription, DNA-templated; positive regulation of alpha-beta T cell proliferation; regulation of inflammatory response; positive regulation of B cell activation; chemokine (C-C motif) ligand 11 production; positive regulation of CD4-positive, alpha-beta T cell costimulation; positive regulation of interleukin-4-dependent isotype switching to IgE isotypes; inflammatory response
Sources:Amigo / QuickGO
Orthologs
Databases	NCBI: entry; OMA: entry
Species	Human	Mouse
Entrez	7292	22164
Ensembl	ENSG00000117586	ENSMUSG00000026700
UniProt	P23510	P43488
RefSeq (mRNA)	NM_001297562; NM_003326	NM_009452
RefSeq (protein)	NP_001284491; NP_003317	NP_033478
Location (UCSC)	Chr 1: 173.18 – 173.21 Mb	Chr 1: 161.22 – 161.25 Mb
PubMed search
- Wikidata
View/Edit Human	View/Edit Mouse

OX40 ligand, also called Tumor necrosis factor ligand superfamily member 4, is a protein that in humans is encoded by the gene TNFSF4. OX40L is the ligand for OX40 (aka TNFRSF4). OX40L is also known as CD134L and is stably expressed on many antigen-presenting cells such as DC2s (a subtype of dendritic cells), macrophages, and activated B lymphocytes.

The OX40 molecule, conversely, is present on the surface of activated T lymphocytes (mainly CD4+ T cells), but also on NK cells, NKT cells, and neutrophils. The ligation of OX40-OX40L is a source of survival signal for T cells and enables the development of memory T cells. Signaling through these two molecules also leads to polarization towards Th2 immune response even in an environment with low levels of IL-4 cytokine.

OX40L is also present on the surface of many non-immune cells, for example, endothelial cells and smooth muscle cells.

The surface expression of OX40L is induced by many pro-inflammatory mediators, such as TNF-α, e.g. produced by mast cells, IFN-γ and PGE2 (prostaglandin E2).

OX40L has also been designated CD252 (cluster of differentiation 252).

Various single-nucleotide polymorphisms (SNPs) of the OX40L gene have been identified. For some of them association with systemic lupus erythematosus has been reported. No association with occurrence of atherosclerosis has been found.
