= Belantamab mafodotin =

Pharmaceutical drug

Monoclonal antibody
- Type: Whole antibody
- Source: Humanized
- Target: B-cell maturation antigen (BCMA) (CD269)

Clinical data
- Trade names: Blenrep
- Other names: GSK2857916, GSK-2857916, belantamab mafodotin-blmf
- AHFS/Drugs.com: Monograph
- MedlinePlus: a620052
- License data: US DailyMed: Belantamab mafodotin
- Routes of administration: Intravenous
- Drug class: Antineoplastic agent
- ATC code: L01FX15 (WHO)

Legal status
- Legal status: CA: ℞-only / Schedule D; US: ℞-only; EU: Rx-only

Identifiers
- CAS Number: 2050232-20-5
- DrugBank: DB15719
- UNII: DB1041CXDG
- KEGG: D11595

Chemical and physical data
- Formula: C_{6484}H_{10038}N_{1728}O_{2026}S_{44}
- Molar mass: 146026.34 g·mol^{−1}

Belantamab mafodotin, sold under the brand name Blenrep, is a monoclonal antibody conjugated with a cytotoxic agent for the treatment of relapsed and refractory multiple myeloma. Belantamab mafodotin is a B-cell maturation antigen (BCMA)-directed antibody and microtubule inhibitor conjugate.

The most common adverse reactions include keratopathy (corneal epithelium change on eye exam), decreased visual acuity, nausea, blurred vision, pyrexia, infusion-related reactions, and fatigue.

Belantamab mafodotin is a humanized IgG1κ monoclonal antibody against the B-cell maturation antigen (BCMA) conjugated with a cytotoxic agent, maleimidocaproyl monomethyl auristatin F (mcMMAF). The antibody-drug conjugate binds to BCMA on myeloma cell surfaces causing cell cycle arrest and inducing antibody-dependent cellular cytotoxicity.

Belantamab mafodotin was approved for medical use in the United States and in the European Union in August 2020. The US Food and Drug Administration considers it to be a first-in-class medication.

== Medical uses ==
In the EU, belantamab mafodotin is indicated for the treatment of adults with relapsed or refractory multiple myeloma: in combination with bortezomib and dexamethasone in people who have received at least one prior therapy; and in combination with pomalidomide and dexamethasone in people who have received at least one prior therapy including lenalidomide.

In the US, belantamab mafodotin is indicated for use in combination with bortezomib and dexamethasone for the treatment of adults with relapsed or refractory multiple myeloma who have received at least two prior lines of therapy, including a proteasome inhibitor and an immunomodulatory agent.

== Adverse effects ==
The US prescribing information includes a boxed warning stating belantamab mafodotin causes changes in the corneal epithelium resulting in alterations in vision, including severe vision loss and corneal ulcer, and symptoms, such as blurred vision and dry eyes. Among those receiving belantamab mafodotin in DREAMM-7, ocular toxicity occurred in 92% of participants, including grade 3 or 4 in 77%, with 83% requiring dosage modification due to ocular toxicity. Because of the risk of ocular toxicity, belantamab mafodotin is available in the US only through a risk evaluation and mitigation strategy (REMS), called the BLENREP REMS. Other warnings and precautions include thrombocytopenia and embryo-fetal toxicity.

== History ==
Belantamab mafodotin was evaluated in DREAMM-2 (NCT03525678), an open-label, multi-center trial. Participants received either belantamab mafodotin, 2.5 mg/kg or 3.4 mg/kg intravenously, once every three weeks until disease progression or unacceptable toxicity.

Efficacy was based on overall response rate (ORR) and response duration, as evaluated by an independent review committee using the International Myeloma Working Group uniform response criteria. The ORR was 31% (97.5% CI: 21%, 43%). Seventy-three percent of responders had response durations ≥6 months. These results were observed in participants receiving the recommended dose of 2.5 mg/kg.

The US Food and Drug Administration (FDA) granted the application for belantamab mafodotin priority review, orphan drug, and breakthrough therapy designations.

In 2023, the confirmatory phase III DREAMM-3 trial aimed to compare belantamab mafodotin versus pomalidomide plus low-dose dexamethasone in participants with relapsed or refractory multiple myeloma. Due to the trial results, the manufacturer is voluntarily withdrawing belantamab mafodotin from the market.

The efficacy of belantamab mafodotin with bortezomib and dexamethasone was evaluated in DREAMM-7 (NCT04246047), an open-label, randomized, multi-center trial in adults with relapsed or refractory multiple myeloma who had received at least one line of prior therapy. The trial excluded people who were refractory or intolerant to daratumumab or bortezomib, had received prior B-cell maturation antigen-directed therapy, and had existing corneal disease, except for mild punctate keratopathy.

== Society and culture ==
=== Legal status ===
Belantamab mafodotin was approved for medical use in the United States and in the European Union in August 2020.

Belantamab mafodotin was withdrawn in the United States and the European Union. In November 2022, GSK initiated the process for withdrawal of the United States marketing authorization for belantamab mafodotin following the request of the US Food and Drug Administration (FDA). This request was based on the outcome of the DREAMM-3 phase III confirmatory trial, which did not meet the requirements of the US FDA accelerated approval regulations.

In May 2025, the Committee for Medicinal Products for Human Use of the European Medicines Agency adopted a positive opinion, recommending the granting of a marketing authorization for the medicinal product Blenrep, intended for the treatment of relapsed or refractory multiple myeloma. The applicant for this medicinal product is GlaxoSmithKline Trading Services Limited. Blenrep was reauthorized for medical use in the European Union in July 2025.

Belantamab mafodotin was reapproved for medical use in the United States in October 2025.

=== Names ===
Belantamab mafodotin is the international nonproprietary name (INN).
