= Tisotumab vedotin =

Monoclonal antibodies for tumors

Monoclonal antibody
- Type: Whole antibody
- Source: Human
- Target: Tissue factor (TF)

Clinical data
- Trade names: Tivdak
- Other names: Tisotumab vedotin-tftv
- License data: US DailyMed: Tisotumab vedotin
- Pregnancy category: Contraindicated
- Routes of administration: Intravenous
- Drug class: Antineoplastic
- ATC code: L01FX23 (WHO)

Legal status
- Legal status: US: ℞-only; EU: Rx-only

Pharmacokinetic data
- Protein binding: 68–82% (MMAE)
- Metabolism: Liver, by CYP3A4 (MMAE)
- Metabolites: MMAE
- Elimination half-life: 4 days
- Excretion: Fecal, renal (MMAE)

Identifiers
- CAS Number: 1418731-10-8
- DrugBank: DB16732
- UNII: T41737F88A
- KEGG: D11814

Tisotumab vedotin, sold under the brand name Tivdak, is an antibody-drug conjugate used to treat cervical cancer. It is a combination of tisotumab, a monoclonal antibody against tissue factor, and monomethyl auristatin E (MMAE), a potent inhibitor of cell division. It is administered by infusion into a vein.

Tisotumab vedotin was approved for medical use in the United States in September 2021, and in the European Union in March 2025. The US Food and Drug Administration considers it to be a first-in-class medication.

== Adverse effects ==
In the United States, Tivdak carries a boxed warning for ocular toxicity, which occurs in up to 60% of treated patients. In clinical trials, the most common forms of ocular toxicity were dry eye, conjunctivitis, corneal damage, and blepharitis.

Other common adverse effects include bleeding (occurring in approximately 60% of patients, most often nosebleed) and peripheral neuropathy (42% of patients). Like all drugs containing MMAE, tisotumab vedotin can cause inflammation of the lungs.

== Mechanism of action ==
The antibody portion of tisotumab vedotin (tisotumab) binds to and forms a complex with tissue factor, a molecule expressed on the surface of cancer cells. This complex is then taken up into the cell, where tisotumab vedotin is broken down by proteolytic cleavage, releasing MMAE, which stops the cell cycle and kills the cell by apoptosis.

== History ==
Tisotumab vedotin was developed by Genmab in Utrecht, the Netherlands, and Copenhagen, Denmark, with the code name TF-011-MMAE. In September 2021, tisotumab vedotin was granted accelerated approval by United States Food and Drug Administration for the use of recurrent or metastatic cervical cancer with disease progression on or after chemotherapy.

== Society and culture ==
=== Legal status ===
In April 2024, tisotumab vedotin was granted traditional approval by the US Food and Drug Administration (FDA) for recurrent or metastatic cervical cancer with disease progression on or after chemotherapy. Tisotumab vedotin previously received accelerated approval for this indication.

In January 2025, the Committee for Medicinal Products for Human Use of the European Medicines Agency (EMA) adopted a positive opinion, recommending the granting of a marketing authorization for the medicinal product Tivdak, intended for the treatment of recurrent or metastatic cervical cancer. The applicant for this medicinal product is Pfizer Europe MA EEIG. Tisotumab vedotin was authorized for medical use in the European Union in March 2025.

=== Names ===
Tisotumab vedotin is the international nonproprietary name. Tivdak is the brand name for tisotumab vedotin in the United States.
