= Monomethyl auristatin F =

Names
- IUPAC name (S)-2-((2R,3R)-3-((S)-1-((3R,4S,5S)-4-((S)-N,3-dimethyl-2-((S)-3-methyl-2-(methylamino)butanamido)butanamido)-3-methoxy-5-methylheptanoyl)pyrrolidin-2-yl)-3-methoxy-2-methylpropanamido)-3-phenylpropanoic acid

Identifiers
CAS Number	745017-94-1
3D model (JSmol)	Interactive image
Abbreviations	MMAF
ChemSpider	8570614
PubChem CID	10395173
UNII	1Z1AI9IW5L
CompTox Dashboard (EPA)	DTXSID601031563
- InChI: InChI=1S/C39H65N5O8/c1-12-25(6)34(43(9)38(48)33(24(4)5)42-37(47)32(40-8)23(2)3)30(51-10)22-31(45)44-20-16-19-29(44)35(52-11)26(7)36(46)41-28(39(49)50)21-27-17-14-13-15-18-27/h13-15,17-18,23-26,28-30,32-35,40H,12,16,19-22H2,1-11H3,(H,41,46)(H,42,47)(H,49,50)/t25-,26+,28-,29-,30+,32-,33-,34-,35+/m0/s1 Key: MFRNYXJJRJQHNW-DEMKXPNLSA-N; InChI=1/C39H65N5O8/c1-12-25(6)34(43(9)38(48)33(24(4)5)42-37(47)32(40-8)23(2)3)30(51-10)22-31(45)44-20-16-19-29(44)35(52-11)26(7)36(46)41-28(39(49)50)21-27-17-14-13-15-18-27/h13-15,17-18,23-26,28-30,32-35,40H,12,16,19-22H2,1-11H3,(H,41,46)(H,42,47)(H,49,50)/t25-,26+,28-,29-,30+,32-,33-,34-,35+/m0/s1 Key: MFRNYXJJRJQHNW-DEMKXPNLBL
- SMILES: O=C(N2[C@H]([C@H](OC)[C@H](C(=O)N[C@H](C(=O)O)Cc1ccccc1)C)CCC2)C[C@@H](OC)[C@@H](N(C(=O)[C@@H](NC(=O)[C@@H](NC)C(C)C)C(C)C)C)[C@@H](C)CC

Properties
Chemical formula	C_{39}H_{65}N_{5}O_{8}
Molar mass	731.976 g·mol^{−1}
- Except where otherwise noted, data are given for materials in their standard state (at 25 °C [77 °F], 100 kPa). Infobox references

Monomethyl auristatin F (MMAF) is a synthetic antineoplastic agent. It is part of the approved drug belantamab mafodotin in multiple myeloma and some experimental anti-cancer antibody-drug conjugates such as vorsetuzumab mafodotin and SGN-CD19A. In International Nonproprietary Names for MMAF-antibody-conjugates, the name mafodotin refers to MMAF plus its attachment structure to the antibody.

== Mechanism of action ==
Monomethyl auristatin F is an antimitotic agent which inhibits cell division by blocking the polymerisation of tubulin. It is linked to an antibody with high affinity to structures on cancer cells, causing MMAF to accumulate in such cells.

== Chemistry ==
MMAF is actually desmethyl-auristatin F; that is, the N-terminal amino group has only one methyl substituent instead of two as in auristatin F itself.

Structure of conjugate of MMAF with a monoclonal antibody (MAB). The attachment group consists of maleimide and caproic acid. About eight such structures are bound to a single antibody molecule.

== See also ==
- Monomethyl auristatin E
