= Brentuximab vedotin =

Pharmaceutical drug

Monoclonal antibody
- Type: Whole antibody
- Source: Chimeric (mouse/human)
- Target: CD30

Clinical data
- Trade names: Adcetris
- Other names: SGN-35, previously cAC10-vcMMAE
- AHFS/Drugs.com: Monograph
- MedlinePlus: a611052
- License data: US DailyMed: Brentuximab
- Pregnancy category: AU: D
- Routes of administration: Intravenous
- ATC code: L01FX05 (WHO)

Legal status
- Legal status: AU: S4 (Prescription only); US: ℞-only; EU: Rx-only

Identifiers
- CAS Number: 914088-09-8
- DrugBank: DB08870
- ChemSpider: none
- UNII: 7XL5ISS668

Chemical and physical data
- Formula: C_{6476}H_{9930}N_{1690}O_{2030}S_{40} (C_{68}H_{105}N_{11}O_{15})_{3–5}
- Molar mass: 149.2–151.8 kg/mol

Brentuximab vedotin, sold under the brand name Adcetris, is an antibody-drug conjugate medication used to treat relapsed or refractory Hodgkin lymphoma (HL) and systemic anaplastic large cell lymphoma (ALCL), a type of T cell non-Hodgkin lymphoma. It selectively targets tumor cells expressing the CD30 antigen, a defining marker of Hodgkin lymphoma and ALCL. The drug is being jointly marketed by Millennium Pharmaceuticals outside the US and by Seagen in the US.

== Medical uses ==
In the United States, brentuximab vedotin is indicated for the treatment of Hodgkin lymphoma, systemic anaplastic large cell lymphoma, primary cutaneous anaplastic large cell lymphoma, and CD30-expressing mycosis fungoides.

In the European Union, brentuximab vedotin is indicated for the treatment of Hodgkin lymphoma, systemic anaplastic large cell lymphoma, and cutaneous T cell lymphoma.

== Design ==
Brentuximab vedotin consists of the chimeric monoclonal antibody brentuximab (cAC10, which targets the cell-membrane protein CD30) linked with maleimide attachment groups, cathepsin-cleavable linkers (valine-citrulline), and para-aminobenzylcarbamate spacers to three to five units of the antimitotic agent monomethyl auristatin E (MMAE, reflected by the 'vedotin' in the drug's name). The peptide-based linker bonds the antibody to the cytotoxic compound in a stable manner so the drug is not easily released from the antibody under physiologic conditions to help prevent toxicity to healthy cells and ensure dosage efficiency. The peptide antibody-drug bond facilitates rapid and efficient drug cleavage inside target tumor cell. The antibody cAC10 part of the drug binds to CD30 which often occurs on diseased cells but rarely on normal tissues. The antibody portion of the drug attaches to CD30 on the surface of malignant cells, delivering MMAE which is responsible for the anti-tumour activity. Once bound, brentuximab vedotin is internalised by endocytosis and thus selectively taken up by targeted cells. The vesicle containing the drug is fused with lysosomes and lysosomal cysteine proteases, particularly cathepsin B, start to break down valine-citrulline linker and MMAE is no longer bound to the antibody and is released directly into the tumor environment.

Skeletal formula of brentuximab vedotin. Three to five units of MMAE are attached to the monoclonal antibody (MAB) brentuximab via the spacer para-aminobenzylcarbamate (marked green), a cathepsin-cleavable linker (Cit=citrulline, Val=valine, marked blue), and an attachment group consisting of caproic acid and maleimide (marked brown).

== Serious adverse events ==
Brentuximab vedotin was studied as monotherapy in 160 patients in two phase II trials. Across both trials, the most common adverse reactions (≥20%), regardless of causality, were chemotherapy-induced peripheral neuropathy (a progressive, enduring and often irreversible tingling numbness, intense pain, and hypersensitivity to cold, beginning in the hands and feet and sometimes involving the arms and legs), neutropenia (an immune system impairment), fatigue, nausea, anemia, upper respiratory tract infection, diarrhea, fever, rash, thrombocytopenia, cough and vomiting.

=== Black box warning ===
In January 2012, the FDA announced that because brentuximab vedotin had been linked with two cases of progressive multifocal leukoencephalopathy, they were requiring the addition of a black box warning to the drug label regarding this potential risk.

== Society and culture ==
=== Legal status ===
In August 2011, the US Food and Drug Administration (FDA) granted accelerated approval to the biologics license application (BLA) submitted by Seattle Genetics for the use of brentuximab vedotin in the treatment of relapsed HL and ALCL.

In October 2012, the European Medicines Agency (EMA) gave it conditional marketing authorization for relapsed or refractory HL and ALCL.

In November 2017, the FDA approved brentuximab vedotin as a treatment for patients with cutaneous T-cell lymphoma (CTCL) who have received prior systemic therapy. This approval is for patients with primary cutaneous anaplastic large cell lymphoma (pcALCL) and CD30-expressing mycosis fungoides (MF).

In March 2018, the FDA approved brentuximab vedotin to treat adults with previously untreated stage III or IV classical Hodgkin lymphoma (cHL) in combination with chemotherapy.

In November 2018, the FDA expanded the approved use of brentuximab vedotin in combination with chemotherapy for adults with certain types of peripheral T-cell lymphoma (PTCL). This is the first FDA approval for treatment of newly diagnosed PTCL.

In November 2022, the FDA approved brentuximab vedotin in combination with doxorubicin, vincristine, etoposide, prednisone, and cyclophosphamide for people aged two years of age and older with previously untreated high risk classical Hodgkin lymphoma. This is the first pediatric approval for brentuximab vedotin.

=== Economics ===
The Australian Pharmaceutical Benefits Advisory Committee (PBAC) considered a March 2014 application by the manufacturer for inclusion of brentuximab vedotin under a Pharmaceutical Benefits Scheme Section 100 (Efficient Funding of Chemotherapy) arrangement. While this application was accepted, the committee noted that on the basis of inadequate cost-benefit, the medicine would not be made available more generally for the first-line treatment of relapsed or refractory systemic anaplastic large cell lymphoma (sALCL).

=== Brand names ===
Brentuximab vedotin is marketed as Adcetris.

== Research ==
=== Clinical trials ===
In a 2010, clinical trial, 34% of patients with refractory Hodgkin lymphoma achieved complete remission and another 40% had partial remission. Tumor reductions were achieved in 94% of patients. In ALCL, 87% of patients had tumors shrink at least 50% and 97% of patients had some tumor shrinkage.

Reports in 2013, showed interim results from a Phase II, open-label, single-arm study designed to evaluate the antitumor activity of brentuximab vedotin in relapsed or refractory CD30-positive NHL, including B-cell neoplasms. These results demonstrated that single-agent brentuximab vedotin induced a 42% objective response rate and manageable safety profile among advanced diffuse large B-cell lymphoma patients.

A phase III trial funded by Millennium Pharmaceuticals compared ABVD (a combination of the chemotherapy drugs doxorubicin, bleomycin, vinblastine, and dacarbazine) versus A+AVD (a combination of brentuximab vedotin plus AVD, or doxorubicin, vinblastine, and dacarbazine) for treatment of classical Hodgkin lymphoma and found substituting brentuximab vedotin for bleomycin has both improved efficacy and lowered toxicity. A previously completed phase I study demonstrated that a greater number of patients experienced pulmonary toxicity with brentuximab vedotin-ABVD than with ABVD alone. Pulmonary fibrosis is a classical adverse effect of bleomycin; however, the incidence of pulmonary fibrosis in the brentuximab vedotin-ABVD arm was higher than the expected historical rate with ABVD alone. Overall, 24 out of 25 patients treated with brentuximab vedotin and AVD achieved complete remission.

Brentuximab vedotin is also being investigated as a substitute for vincristine (another mitotic inhibitor which prevents tubulin polymerization) in patients with being treated with CHOP (a combination of cyclophosphamide, hydroxydaunorubicin, vincristine, prednisone or prednisolone) for a non-Hodgkin lymphoma.

A phase III clinical trial comparing the two combination therapies (CHOP and CHP-brentuximab vedotin) was completed in October 2020, with results published in 2021.

The ECHELON-1 phase 3 trial compared brentuximab vedotin with bleomycin both in combination with adriamycin, vinblastine, dacarbazine (AVD) chemotherapy as a firstline treatment for advanced classical Hodgkin lymphoma. The outcome of the trial resulted in a positive recommendation by the Committee for Medicinal Products for Human Use (CHMP) as part of a combination treatment in adults with previously untreated CD30+ stage 3 Hodgkin lymphoma.
