= TRAF5 =

Protein-coding gene in humans

Identifiers
- Aliases: TRAF5, MGC:39780, RNF84, TNF receptor associated factor 5
- External IDs: OMIM: 602356; MGI: 107548; GeneCards: TRAF5
Available structures
PDB	Ortholog search: PDBe RCSB
PDB	List of PDB id codes 4GJH

Gene location (Human)
Chr.	Chromosome 1 (human)
Band	1q32.3	Start	211,326,615 bp
Band	1q32.3	End	211,374,946 bp

Gene location (Mouse)
Chr.	Chromosome 1 (mouse)
Band	1 H6|1 97.11 cM	Start	191,729,166 bp
Band	1 H6|1 97.11 cM	End	191,776,868 bp
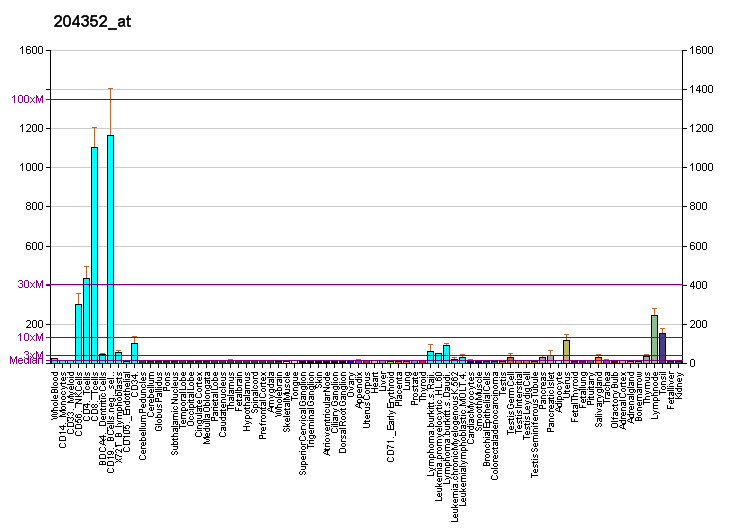
RNA expression pattern
Bgee	Human / Mouse (ortholog); Top expressed in: saphenous vein; body of pancreas; superficial temporal artery; lymph node; gastric mucosa; ascending aorta; right coronary artery; left uterine tube; Descending thoracic aorta; Epithelium of choroid plexus / Top expressed in: spleen; urinary bladder; neural layer of retina; bone marrow; granulocyte; proximal tubule; lung; esophagus; islet of Langerhans; zone of skin; More reference expression data
BioGPS	More reference expression data
Gene ontology
Molecular function	thioesterase binding; zinc ion binding; protein binding; ubiquitin protein ligase binding; metal ion binding; identical protein binding; tumor necrosis factor receptor binding
Cellular component	cytosol; cytoplasmic side of plasma membrane; centrosome; CD40 receptor complex; cytoplasm; protein-containing complex
Biological process	regulation of apoptotic process; positive regulation of I-kappaB kinase/NF-kappaB signaling; positive regulation of DNA-binding transcription factor activity; positive regulation of NF-kappaB transcription factor activity; signal transduction; apoptotic process
Sources:Amigo / QuickGO
Orthologs
Databases	NCBI: entry; OMA: entry
Species	Human	Mouse
Entrez	7188	22033
Ensembl	ENSG00000082512	ENSMUSG00000026637
UniProt	O00463	P70191
RefSeq (mRNA)	NM_001033910; NM_004619; NM_145759; NM_001319207	NM_011633
RefSeq (protein)	NP_001029082; NP_001306136; NP_004610; NP_665702	NP_035763
Location (UCSC)	Chr 1: 211.33 – 211.37 Mb	Chr 1: 191.73 – 191.78 Mb
PubMed search
- Wikidata
View/Edit Human	View/Edit Mouse

TNF receptor-associated factor 5 is a protein that in humans is encoded by the TRAF5 gene.

== Function ==
The scaffold protein encoded by this gene is a member of the tumor necrosis factor receptor-associated factor (TRAF) protein family and contains a meprin and TRAF homology (MATH) domain, a RING-type zinc finger, and two TRAF-type zinc fingers. TRAF proteins are associated with, and mediate signal transduction from members of the TNF receptor superfamily. This protein is one of the components of a multiple protein complex which binds to tumor necrosis factor (TNF) receptor cytoplasmic domains and mediates TNF-induced activation. Alternate transcriptional splice variants have been characterized.

== Interactions ==
TRAF5 has been shown to interact with:

- ASK1,
- CD134,
- CD30,
- CD40,
- RANK
- TNFRSF13B, and
- TNFRSF14.
