= CD30 =

Mammalian protein found in humans

TNFRSF8
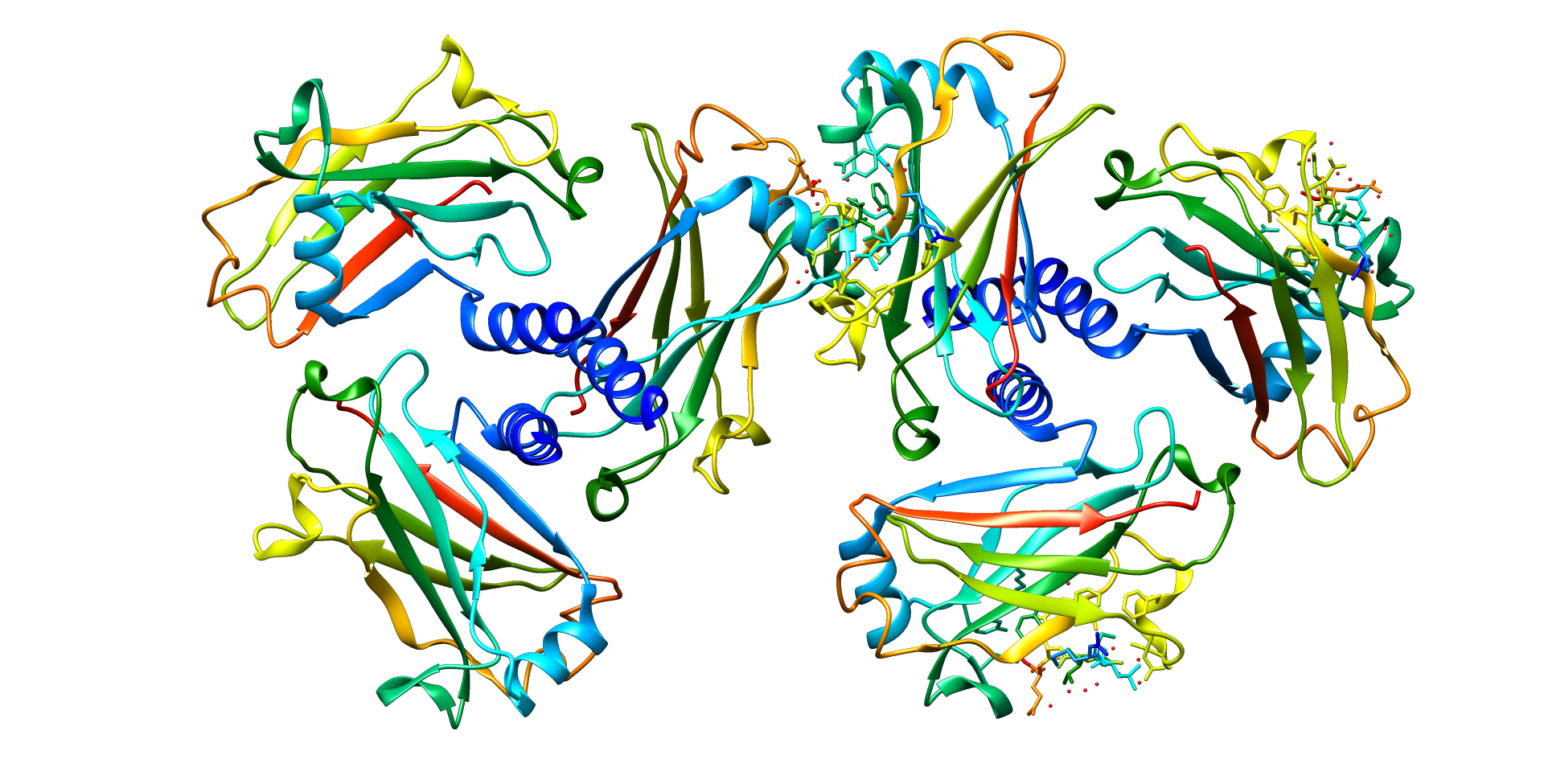

Identifiers
- Aliases: TNFRSF8, CD30, D1S166E, Ki-1, tumor necrosis factor receptor superfamily member 8, TNF receptor superfamily member 8
- External IDs: OMIM: 153243; MGI: 99908; GeneCards: TNFRSF8
Available structures
PDB	Ortholog search: PDBe RCSB
PDB	List of PDB id codes 1D01

Gene location (Human)
Chr.	Chromosome 1 (human)
Band	1p36.22	Start	12,063,303 bp
Band	1p36.22	End	12,144,207 bp

Gene location (Mouse)
Chr.	Chromosome 4 (mouse)
Band	4 E1|4 78.17 cM	Start	144,993,707 bp
Band	4 E1|4 78.17 cM	End	145,041,734 bp
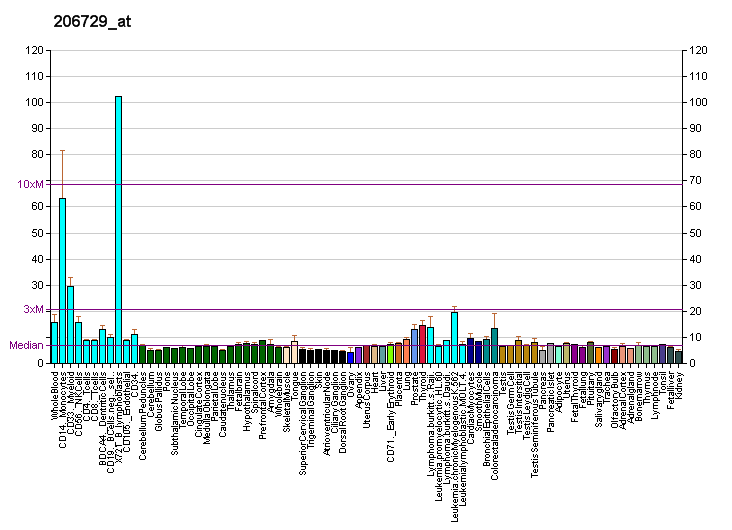
RNA expression pattern
Bgee	Human / Mouse (ortholog); Top expressed in: granulocyte; monocyte; testicle; blood; pancreatic ductal cell; decidua; subcutaneous adipose tissue; periodontal fiber; appendix; right auricle of heart / Top expressed in: neural layer of retina; blastocyst; secondary oocyte; embryo; zygote; morula; embryo; thymus; dentate gyrus of hippocampal formation granule cell; primary oocyte; More reference expression data
BioGPS	More reference expression data
Gene ontology
Molecular function	transmembrane signaling receptor activity; tumor necrosis factor-activated receptor activity; nerve growth factor binding
Cellular component	cytoplasm; integral component of membrane; integral component of plasma membrane; extracellular exosome; membrane; plasma membrane; nucleus; neuron projection
Biological process	apoptotic signaling pathway; cellular response to mechanical stimulus; response to lipopolysaccharide; inflammatory response; immune response; signal transduction; negative regulation of cell population proliferation; positive regulation of apoptotic process; tumor necrosis factor-mediated signaling pathway; axon guidance; negative regulation of neuron projection development; positive regulation of NF-kappaB transcription factor activity
Sources:Amigo / QuickGO
Orthologs
Databases	NCBI: entry; OMA: entry
Species	Human	Mouse
Entrez	943	21941
Ensembl	ENSG00000120949	ENSMUSG00000028602
UniProt	P28908	Q60846
RefSeq (mRNA)	NM_001243; NM_001281430; NM_152942	NM_009401
RefSeq (protein)	NP_001234; NP_001268359	NP_033427
Location (UCSC)	Chr 1: 12.06 – 12.14 Mb	Chr 4: 144.99 – 145.04 Mb
PubMed search
- Wikidata
View/Edit Human	View/Edit Mouse

TNF receptor superfamily member 8, also known as CD30, is a cell membrane protein of the tumor necrosis factor receptor family encoded by the TNFRSF8 gene. It is a tumor marker for Hodgkin lymphoma and anaplastic large cell lymphoma.

== Function ==
This receptor is expressed by activated, but not by resting, T and B cells. TRAF2 and TRAF5 can interact with this receptor, and mediate the signal transduction that leads to the activation of NF-kappaB. It is a positive regulator of apoptosis, and also has been shown to limit the proliferative potential of autoreactive CD8 effector T cells and protect the body against autoimmunity. Two alternatively spliced transcript variants of this gene encoding distinct isoforms have been reported.

== Clinical significance ==
CD30 is associated with anaplastic large cell lymphoma. It is expressed in embryonal carcinoma but not in seminoma and is thus a useful marker in distinguishing between these germ cell tumors. CD30 and CD15 are also expressed on Reed–Sternberg cells typical for Hodgkin's lymphoma.

== Cancer treatment ==
CD30 is the target of the FDA approved therapeutic brentuximab vedotin (Adcetris). It is approved for use in:

1. Hodgkin lymphoma (HL) (brentuximab vedotin) after failure of autologous stem cell transplant (ASCT)
2. HL in patients who are not ASCT candidates after failure of at least 2 multiagent chemotherapy regimens
3. Systemic anaplastic large cell lymphoma (sALCL) after failure of at least 1 multiagent chemotherapy regimen
4. Primary cutaneous anaplastic large cell lymphoma (pcALCL) or CD30-expressing mycosis fungoides (MF) who have received prior systemic therapy
5. Various types of CD30-positive T cell lymphomas

Brentuximab vedotin is also currently being studied in and recommended for treating:

1. Various types of CD30-positive B cell lymphomas
2. CD30-positive cases of the NK cell lymphoma, extranodal NK/T-cell lymphoma, nasal type

== Interactions ==
CD30 has been shown to interact with TRAF5, and TRAF2.
