= Antibody–drug conjugate =

Class of biopharmaceutical drugs

Schematic structure of an antibody–drug conjugate (ADC)

Antibody–drug conjugates or ADCs are a class of bioconjugates and immunoconjugates. ADCs are composed of an antibody linked to a cytotoxic (anticancer) "payload" or drug.

Among treatment options for cancer, chemotherapy is most widely used. Its main limitation is low target specificity. Unlike chemotherapy, ADCs target tumor cells while sparing healthy cells. As of 2019, some 56 pharmaceutical companies were developing ADCs.

ADCs combine the targeting properties of monoclonal antibodies with the cancer-killing capabilities of cytotoxic drugs, designed to discriminate between healthy and diseased tissue.

== Mechanism of action ==
An anticancer drug is coupled to an antibody that targets a specific tumor antigen (or protein) that, ideally, is only found in or on tumor cells. The biochemical reaction that occurs upon attaching triggers a signal in the tumor cell, which then absorbs, or internalizes, the antibody together with the linked cytotoxin. After the ADC is internalized, the cytotoxin kills the cancer. Their targeting ability was believed to limit side effects for cancer patients and to give a wider therapeutic window than other chemotherapeutic agents, although this promise hasn't yet been realized in the clinic.

ADC technologies have been featured in many publications, including scientific journals.

== History ==
The idea of drugs that would target tumor cells and ignore others was conceived in 1900 by German Nobel laureate Paul Ehrlich; he described the drugs as a "magic bullet" due to their targeting properties.

In 2001 Pfizer/Wyeth's drug Gemtuzumab ozogamicin (brand name: Mylotarg) was approved based on a study with a surrogate endpoint, through the accelerated approval process. In June 2010, after evidence accumulated showing no evidence of benefit and significant toxicity, the U.S. Food and Drug Administration (FDA) forced the company to withdraw it. Pfizer resubmitted it in 2017 based on a meta-analysis of prior trials and a new phase III trial. It was reintroduced into the US market in 2017.

Brentuximab vedotin (brand name: Adcetris, marketed by Seattle Genetics and Millennium/Takeda) was approved for relapsed HL and relapsed systemic anaplastic large-cell lymphoma (sALCL)) by the FDA on August 19, 2011, and received conditional marketing authorization from the European Medicines Agency in October 2012.

Trastuzumab emtansine (ado-trastuzumab emtansine or T-DM1, brand name: Kadcyla, marketed by Genentech and Roche) was approved in February 2013 for the treatment of people with HER2-positive metastatic breast cancer (mBC) who had received prior treatment with trastuzumab and a taxane chemotherapy.

The European Commission approved Inotuzumab ozogamicin as a monotherapy for the treatment of adults with relapsed or refractory CD22-positive B-cell precursor acute lymphoblastic leukemia (ALL) on June 30, 2017, under the brand name Besponsa (Pfizer/Wyeth), followed on August 17, 2017, by the FDA.

The first immunology antibody–drug conjugate (iADC), ABBV-3373, showed an improvement in disease activity in a Phase 2a study of patients with rheumatoid arthritis and a study with the second iADC, ABBV-154 to evaluate adverse events and change in disease activity in participants treated with subcutaneous injection of ABBV-154 is ongoing.

In July 2018, Daiichi Sankyo Company, Limited and Glycotope GmbH have inked a pact regarding the combination of Glycotope's investigational tumor-associated TA-MUC1 antibody gatipotuzumab and Daiichi Sankyo's proprietary ADC technology for developing gatipotuzumab antibody drug conjugate.

In 2019 AstraZeneca agreed to pay up to US$6.9 billion to jointly develop DS-8201 with Japan's Daiichi Sankyo. It is intended to replace Herceptin for treating breast cancer. DS8201 carries eight payloads, compared to the usual four.

== Commercial products ==
FDA Approved ADCs
Drug	Brand name	Maker	Condition
Gemtuzumab ozogamicin	Mylotarg	Pfizer/Wyeth	relapsed acute myelogenous leukemia (AML)
Brentuximab vedotin	Adcetris	Seattle Genetics, Millennium/Takeda	Hodgkin lymphoma (HL) and systemic anaplastic large-cell lymphoma (ALCL)
Trastuzumab emtansine	Kadcyla	Genentech, Roche	HER2-positive metastatic breast cancer (mBC) following treatment with trastuzumab and a maytansinoid
Inotuzumab ozogamicin	Besponsa	Pfizer/Wyeth	relapsed or refractory CD22-positive B-cell precursor acute lymphoblastic leukemia
Polatuzumab vedotin	Polivy	Genentech, Roche	relapsed or refractory diffuse large B-cell lymphoma (DLBCL)
Enfortumab vedotin	Padcev	Astellas/Seattle Genetics	adult patients with locally advanced or metastatic urothelial cancer who have received a PD-1 or PD-L1 inhibitor, and a Pt-containing therapy
Trastuzumab deruxtecan	Enhertu	AstraZeneca/Daiichi Sankyo	adult patients with unresectable or metastatic HER2-positive breast cancer who have received two or more prior anti-HER2 based regimens
Sacituzumab govitecan	Trodelvy	Immunomedics	adult patients with metastatic triple-negative breast cancer (mTNBC) who have received at least two prior therapies for patients with relapsed or refractory metastatic disease
Belantamab mafodotin	Blenrep	GlaxoSmithKline	multiple myeloma patients whose disease has progressed despite prior treatment with an immunomodulatory agent, proteasome inhibitor and anti-CD38 antibody
Moxetumomab pasudotox	Lumoxiti	AstraZeneca	relapsed or refractory hairy cell leukemia (HCL)
Loncastuximab tesirine	Zynlonta	ADC Therapeutics	relapsed or refractory large B-cell lymphoma (including diffuse large B-cell lymphoma (DLBCL) not otherwise specified, DLBCL arising from low-grade lymphoma, and high-grade B-cell lymphoma) after two or more lines of systemic therapy
Tisotumab vedotin-tftv	Tivdak	Seagen Inc, Genmab	adult patients with recurrent or metastatic cervical cancer with disease progression on or after chemotherapy
Mirvetuximab soravtansine	Elahere	ImmunoGen	treatment of adults with folate receptor alpha (FRα)-positive, platinum-resistant epithelial ovarian, fallopian tube, or primary peritoneal cancer, who have received one to three prior systemic treatment regimens
Datopotamab deruxtecan-dlnk	Datroway	AstraZeneca/Daiichi Sankyo	adults with unresectable or metastatic, hormone receptor-positive, HER2-negative (IHC 0, IHC1+ or IHC2+/ISH-) breast cancer who have received prior endocrine-based therapy and chemotherapy for unresectable or metastatic disease.
Telisotuzumab vedotin	Emrelis	AbbVie	treatment of adults with locally advanced or metastatic, non-squamous non-small cell lung cancer with high c-Met protein overexpression after prior systemic therapy.

== Components of an ADC ==
An antibody–drug conjugate consists of three components:

- Antibody - targets the cancer cell surface and may also elicit a therapeutic response.
- Payload - elicits the desired therapeutic response.
- Linker - attaches the payload to the antibody and should be stable in circulation only releasing the payload at the desired target. Multiple approaches to conjugation have been developed for attachment to the antibody and reviewed. DAR is the drug to antibody ratio and indicates the level of loading of the payload on the ADC.

== Payloads ==
Many of the payloads for oncology ADCs (oADC) are natural product based with some making covalent interactions with their target. Payloads include the microtubulin inhibitors monomethyl auristatin E (MMAE), monomethyl auristatin F (MMAF) and mertansine, DNA binder calicheamicin and topoisomerase 1 inhibitors SN-38 and exatecan resulting in a renaissance for natural product total synthesis. Glucocorticoid receptor modulators (GRMs) represent to most active payload class for iADCs. Approaches releasing marketed GRM molecules such as dexamethasone and budesonide have been developed. Modified GRM molecules have also been developed that enable the attachment of the linker with the term ADCidified describing the medicinal chemistry process of payload optimization to facilitate linker attachment. Alternatives to small molecule payloads have also been investigated, for example, siRNA. More recently, targeted protein degraders have been explored as payloads for antibody conjugates. A 2025 study described a KIF11-directed degrader–antibody conjugate (DAC), in which a cereblon-recruiting degrader was used as the payload to induce antigen-dependent protein degradation and cytotoxicity in preclinical models.

== Linkers ==
A stable link between the antibody and cytotoxic (anti-cancer) agent is a crucial aspect of an ADC. A stable ADC linker ensures that less of the cytotoxic payload falls off before reaching a tumor cell, improving safety, and limiting dosages.

Linkers are based on chemical motifs including disulfides, hydrazones or peptides (cleavable), or thioethers (noncleavable). Cleavable and noncleavable linkers were proved to be safe in preclinical and clinical trials. Brentuximab vedotin includes an enzyme-sensitive cleavable linker that delivers the antimicrotubule agent monomethyl auristatin E or MMAE, a synthetic antineoplastic agent, to human-specific CD30-positive malignant cells. MMAE inhibits cell division by blocking the polymerization of tubulin. Because of its high toxicity MMAE cannot be used as a single-agent chemotherapeutic drug. However, MMAE linked to an anti-CD30 monoclonal antibody (cAC10, a cell membrane protein of the tumor necrosis factor or TNF receptor) was stable in extracellular fluid. It is cleavable by cathepsin and safe for therapy. Trastuzumab emtansine is a combination of the microtubule-formation inhibitor mertansine (DM-1) and antibody trastuzumab that employs a stable, non-cleavable linker.

The availability of better and more stable linkers has changed the function of the chemical bond. The type of linker, cleavable or noncleavable, lends specific properties to the cytotoxic drug. For example, a non-cleavable linker keeps the drug within the cell. As a result, the entire antibody, linker and cytotoxic (anti-cancer) agent enter the targeted cancer cell where the antibody is degraded into an amino acid. The resulting complex – amino acid, linker and cytotoxic agent – is considered to be the active drug. In contrast, cleavable linkers are detached by enzymes in the cancer cell. The cytotoxic payload can then escape from the targeted cell and, in a process called "bystander killing", attack neighboring cells.

Another type of cleavable linker, currently in development, adds an extra molecule between the cytotoxin and the cleavage site. This allows researchers to create ADCs with more flexibility without changing cleavage kinetics. Researchers are developing a new method of peptide cleavage based on Edman degradation, a method of sequencing amino acids in a peptide. Also under development are site-specific conjugation (TDCs) and novel conjugation techniques to further improve stability and therapeutic index, α emitting immunoconjugates, antibody-conjugated nanoparticles and antibody-oligonucleotide conjugates.

== Anything Drug Conjugates ==
As the antibody–drug conjugate field has matured, a more accurate definition of ADC is now Anything-Drug Conjugate. Alternatives for the antibody targeting component now include multiple smaller antibody fragments like diabodies, Fab, scFv, and bicyclic peptides.

== Research ==
=== Non-natural amino acids ===
The first generation uses linking technologies that conjugate drugs non-selectively to cysteine or lysine residues in the antibody, resulting in a heterogeneous mixture. This approach leads to suboptimal safety and efficacy and complicates optimization of the biological, physical and pharmacological properties. Site-specific incorporation of unnatural amino acids generates a site for controlled and stable attachment. This enables the production of homogeneous ADCs with the antibody precisely linked to the drug and controlled ratios of antibody to drug, allowing the selection of a best-in-class ADC. An Escherichia coli-based open cell-free synthesis (OCFS) allows the synthesis of proteins containing site-specifically incorporated non-natural amino acids and has been optimized for predictable high-yield protein synthesis and folding. The absence of a cell wall allows the addition of non-natural factors to the system to manipulate transcription, translation and folding to provide precise protein expression modulation.

=== Lysine-depleted variants (LDVs) ===
Another strategy for site-specific amine conjugation to proteins is to replace lysine residues with arginine residues (LDVs). If all lysines are depleted then the only remaining free amine is at the amino terminus (N-terminus) of the protein. In the case where the protein is an antibody Fc domain, a recombinant LDV Fc can still be purified using protein A. LDV Fc proteins fused with short peptide targeting sequences can be used to deliver conjugated payloads, including nanoparticles, to specific cell surface proteins.

=== Other disease areas ===
The majority of ADCs under development or in clinical trials are for oncological and hematological indications. This is primarily driven by the inventory of monoclonal antibodies, which target various types of cancer. However, some developers are looking to expand the application to other important disease areas.
