= Interleukin-17 receptor =

Type of protein receptor

Identifiers
- Symbol: IL17R
- Pfam: PF08357
- InterPro: IPR013568
- Membranome: 8
Available protein structures:
- PDB: IPR013568 PF08357 (ECOD; PDBsum)
- AlphaFold: IPR013568; PF08357

interleukin 17 receptor A
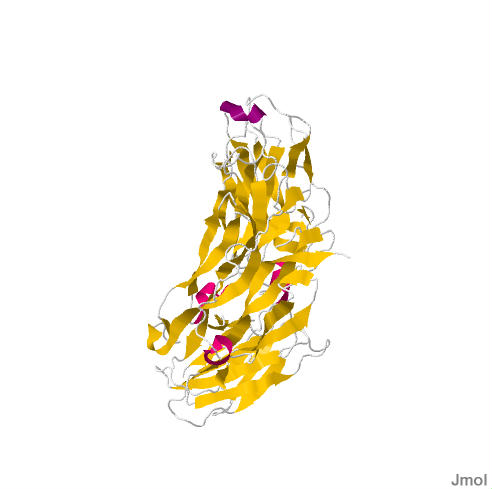
- Crystal structure of a complex of IL-17RA bound to IL-17F in a 1:2 stoichiometry.

Identifiers
- Symbol: IL17RA
- Alt. symbols: IL17R, CDw217
- NCBI gene: 23765
- HGNC: 5985
- OMIM: 605461
- RefSeq: NM_014339
- UniProt: Q96F46

Other data
- Locus: Chr. 22 q11.1
Search for
- Structures: Swiss-model
- Domains: InterPro

interleukin 17 receptor B

Identifiers
- Symbol: IL17RB
- Alt. symbols: IL17BR
- NCBI gene: 55540
- HGNC: 18015
- OMIM: 605458
- RefSeq: NM_172234
- UniProt: Q9NRM6

Other data
- Locus: Chr. 3 p21.1
Search for
- Structures: Swiss-model
- Domains: InterPro

interleukin 17 receptor C

Identifiers
- Symbol: IL17RC
- Alt. symbols: IL17-RL
- NCBI gene: 84818
- HGNC: 18358
- OMIM: 610925
- RefSeq: NM_032732
- UniProt: Q8NAC3

Other data
- Locus: Chr. 3 p25.3
Search for
- Structures: Swiss-model
- Domains: InterPro

Interleukin 17 receptor D

Identifiers
- Symbol: IL17RD
- Alt. symbols: SEF, IL17RLM, FLJ35755, IL-17RD
- NCBI gene: 54756
- HGNC: 17616
- OMIM: 606807
- RefSeq: NM_017563
- UniProt: Q8NFM7

Other data
- Locus: Chr. 3 p21.1
Search for
- Structures: Swiss-model
- Domains: InterPro

interleukin 17 receptor E

Identifiers
- Symbol: IL17RE
- Alt. symbols: FLJ23658
- NCBI gene: 132014
- HGNC: 18439
- RefSeq: NM_153480
- UniProt: Q8NFR9

Other data
- Locus: Chr. 3 p25.3
Search for
- Structures: Swiss-model
- Domains: InterPro

Interleukin 17 receptor E-like

Identifiers
- Symbol: IL17REL
- NCBI gene: 400935
- HGNC: 33808
- RefSeq: NM_001001694
- UniProt: Q6ZVW7

Other data
- Locus: Chr. 22 q13.33
Search for
- Structures: Swiss-model
- Domains: InterPro

Interleukin-17 receptor (IL-17R) is a cytokine receptor which belongs to new subfamily of receptors binding proinflammatory cytokine interleukin 17A, a member of IL-17 family ligands produced by T helper 17 cells (Th17). IL-17R family consists of 5 members: IL-17RA, IL-17RB, IL-17RC, IL-17RD and IL-17RE. Functional IL-17R is a transmembrane receptor complex usually consisting of one IL-17RA, which is a founding member of the family, and second other family subunit, thus forming heteromeric receptor binding different ligands. IL-17A, a founding member of IL-17 ligand family binds to heteromeric IL-17RA/RC receptor complex. IL-17RB binds preferentially IL-17B and IL-17E and heteromeric IL-17RA/RE complex binds IL-17C. However, there is still unknown ligand for IL-17RD. The first identified member IL-17RA is located on human chromosome 22, whereas other subunits IL-17RB to IL-17RD are encoded within human chromosome 3.

== Evolution ==
IL17RD is probably the most ancient member of IL-17 receptor family. It was firstly identified in zebrafish and its homologues were also found in sea lamprey and C. elegans. There are two IL-17Rs (IL-17RA and IL-17RD) in the genome of the basal chordate Amphioxus. After two rounds of whole genome duplications, these two IL-17R genes expanded into five early vertebrate IL-17R genes, IL-17RA to IL-17RE. Two (IL-17RA and IL-17RD) are found in most vertebrates, whereas the other three (IL-17RB, IL-17RC and IL-17RE) have undergone some losses in vertebrates during evolution.

== Structure ==
Structure of IL-17 receptors is unique in comparison with all other known receptor families. IL-17RA is by far the largest member of the family and has the longest cytoplasmic tail of the family. This cytoplasmic tail provides docking sites for numerous signaling intermediates. However, conformational changes mediated after ligand binding are essential for association of these signaling molecules as well as the second receptor subunit and enable subsequent signal transduction. IL-17RA/RC receptor complex is composed of both alpha helices and beta sheets and its extracellular part contains two fibronectin domains, which are involved in formation of two ligand binding sites.

Intracellular part of IL-17 receptors consists of several structural domains including SEFIR motif, a highly conserved motif within IL-17R family. Although SEFIR motif also serves as signaling molecule in IL-1R or Toll-like receptor families, its signaling features and associated adaptor molecules are quite different in IL-17 receptor family. In case of IL-17RA, it has a longer cytoplasmic tail which contains some additional structural domains, such as TILL domain ("TIR-like loop") or inhibitory CBAD domain ("C/EBPβ-activation domain").

== Expression and regulation ==
IL-17RA has been observed at high levels in various tissues such as haematopoietic, bone marrow, thymus, and spleen tissue. IL-17RA is also normally found at low levels in colon, small intestine, and lung tissues. IL-17RA is expressed in CD8+ T cells, and upregulated by IL-15 and IL-21. IL-17RA may be internalised after binding IL-17A.

IL-17RB is highly expressed in the kidney, liver and Th2 cells and its overexpression promotes triggering of Th2 immune response.

IL-17RC expression is low in haematopoietic tissues and high in non-immune cells of the prostate, liver, kidney, thyroid and joints.

Another family subunit IL-17RE is highly expressed in Th17 cells.

== Function ==
Signaling via IL-17R protects our body against several bacterial and fungal infections caused by invading pathogens, especially against Candida albicans. Binding of proinflammatory cytokin IL-17A to IL-17 receptor causes important conformational changes that enable binding of signaling adaptors, such as Act1 or TRAF proteins. Binding of these signaling adaptors triggers activation of several signaling pathways, including NF-κB, pathways of MAPKs (mitogen-activated protein kinases) or C/EBPs pathway. Activation of these pathways results in expression and production of inflammatory cytokines such as TNFα or IL-1β, chemokines, which drive infiltration of macrophages and antimicrobial products, for example defensins and mucins. All these products contribute to the development of inflammation and elimination of various foreign pathogens. Patients with impaired IL-17R signaling suffer from yeast infections, such as CMC (chronic mucocutaneous candidiasis), or respiratory infections.

Apart from production of these inflammatory products de novo, signaling via IL-17R also promotes stabilization of already existent specific mRNA transcripts. This stabilization prolongs the half-life of mRNAs and prevents their quick degradation. Again, these mRNA transcripts predominantly encode proinflammatory cytokines or chemokines.

=== Pathology ===
Although IL-17R provides crucial protection against a variety of microbial infections in humans, it must be very strictly regulated. Immoderate and undue activation of IL-17R by IL-17A results in development of several autoimmune diseases, specifically psoriasis or rheumatoid arthritis.

== Clinical significance ==
These days, several monoclonal antibodies neutralizing IL-17A have potential for the treatment of autoimmune diseases in humans, such as plaque psoriasis. Majority of these monoclonal antibodies are humanized IgG1. This therapy may also be soon used for protection against periodontal bone loss as it is currently being tested in mice. IL-17RA has been observed at high levels in people undergoing treatment for cardiac fibroblasts and in certain tissues such as: haematopoietic, bone marrow, thymus, and spleen tissue.

=== As therapy targets ===
Approved anti-IL-17(R) drugs include: Brodalumab (Siliq), an antibody targeting IL-17 receptor is approved for the treatment of psoriasis. Ixekizumab and secukinumab approved for plaque psoriasis are antibodies which target IL-17A itself rather than the receptor.

== See also ==
- T helper 17 cell
- IL-17 family
