= Act 1 adaptor protein =

Type of protein

Act 1 adaptor protein (Act 1) is an essential intermediate in the interleukin-17 pathway. The IL-17 protein is a pro-inflammatory cytokine important for tissue inflammation in host defense against infection and in autoimmune disease. It is produced by the CD4 + T cells, in particular the Th17 cells. There are 6 subtypes of IL-17, from IL-17A to IL17-F, these subtypes have nearly identical structures. We know that the cytokines are interacting homotypically, but IL-17A and IL-17F are capable do perform heterotypic interaction too.

Each cytokine has its own receptor, IL-17RA to IL-17F, and their pathways are still under investigation. It has been proven that these receptors are not using MyD88 and IRAK in their signaling pathways. They indeed use the adaptor Act1 protein, and TRAF family protein in order to activate the nuclear factor-kappa B (NF-κB), a transcription factor involved in the immunity response (see the pathways explanation below). This protein has different binding sites, which can physically attach the different components in order to activate them.

Act1 is crucial in the IL-17 signaling pathway. Moreover, this protein is only used in cells expressing CD40 and CD40L, which are also from the tumor necrosis receptor superfamily and more importantly expressed by B cells. It can also be expressed by other cell types such as epithelial cells, monocytes, basophils, dendritic cells, fibroblasts, smooth muscle cells, endothelial cells. Therefore, Act1 has a very wide impact on the immune system.

Act1 malfunction could induce autoimmunity (see below).

== Structure ==
Some studies have been done in order to understand the structure of each subunit, and their importance in the protein function:

- C-Terminal SEFIR domain (residues 394 to 574): This domain is shared by the Act1 protein and the IL-17R. It has been shown that the two components interact through this domain physically. It allows to start the IL-17 pathway by direct contact between the receptor and the adaptor.
- U3-box: Site in which Act1 can perform the ubiquitination of other proteins.
- TRAF domains (residues 35 to 42, and 333 to 337): Act1 has two TRAF domains. Act1 will interact with the TRAF family proteins, in particular, TRAF6 in order to activate the NF-κB pathway. Indeed, Act1 polyubiquitinates TRAF6. TRAF6 will then be activated and recruit TAK1 (TGFβ Activated Kinase 1 ), leading to the activation of NF-κB.
- HLH-domain (residues 135 to 190): It is a helix-loop-helix (HLH) which allow the interaction with the IkB kinase protein (IKK). This protein allows the phosphorylation of IkB, which is part of a trimer of protein and sequestering the NF-κB. When IKK interacts with Act1, this one will be activated, phosphorylate IkB inducing the releasing of NF-κB which translocates into the nucleus and induces gene expression.

== Act1 in the IL-17 pathway ==
When IL-17 binds to its receptor, IL-17R is activated and recruits Act1 adaptor through the SEFIR domain that they are both sharing.

NF-κB is kept inactive in the cytoplasm by the IkB subunits which is part of a complex composed of two other subunits: IKKγ and IKKα.

Subsequently, Act1 recruits TRAF6 through its TRAF domain and ubiquitinates this protein. Once this protein is ubiquitinated, it will recruit TAK1. It leads to the polyubiquitination of IkB which releases NF-κB, allowing its translocation inside the nucleus.

Act1 also recruits the IKK complex through its HLH domain. This complex phosphorylates the IkB protein which will release as well NF-κB and induce its activation.

== Act1 used by CD40 receptor ==
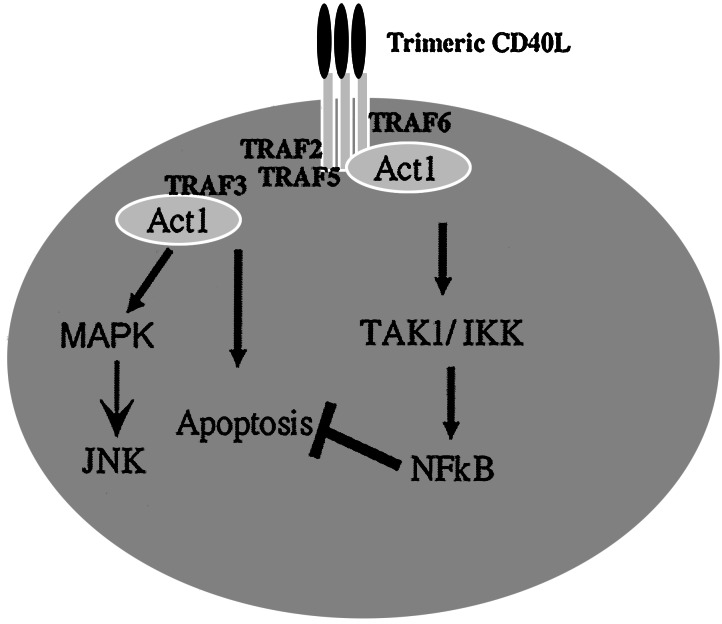
CD40 receptor pathway

Act1 activates NF-κB through the TAK1 and IKK proteins. Nevertheless, TRAF3 is also involved when the CD40 receptor is activated. When CD40 is stimulated by CD40L, Act1 binds to TRAF3, with the help of TRAF2 and 5 in order to activate the JNK proteins. The precise function of TRAF3 remains unknown. Indeed, depending on the TRAF variants involved, the protein has an activatory or inhibitory signal for NF-κB activation. It has been shown that there is mostly an inhibition in the NF-κB signaling when TRAF3 is activated. But, due to the splicing, some variants of TRAF3 have been identified to activate the NF-κB pathway, as well as the TRAF2 and 5. Furthermore, the activation of NF-κB induces the inhibition of the CD40L-induced apoptosis. The function of TRAF3 is complex and not yet fully understood.

== Act1 adaptor and diseases ==
Act1 is an important protein for the immune system functions. Furthermore, its dysfunction is involved in autoimmunity or other diseases, such as allergic airway inflammation or psoriatic arthritis. When the Th17 cell number is enhanced, it leads to the over-production of IL-17, inducing Act1 activation and inflammation, and autoimmunity.

Given the fact that Act1 inhibits the CD40-40L stimulation, its loss would induce an accumulation of B cell population. This enhancement of cells number triggers lymphoma and antibody production, leading to auto-immunity.

Some studies have shown that Act1 could be involved in psoriatic arthritis due to SNP (single nucleotide polymorphism), but the mechanism in which it takes place is still under investigation.

Study this adaptor could be a way to treat the disease related to the IL-17 signaling and Th17 cells.
