= Chronic mucocutaneous candidiasis =

- Other names: CMC
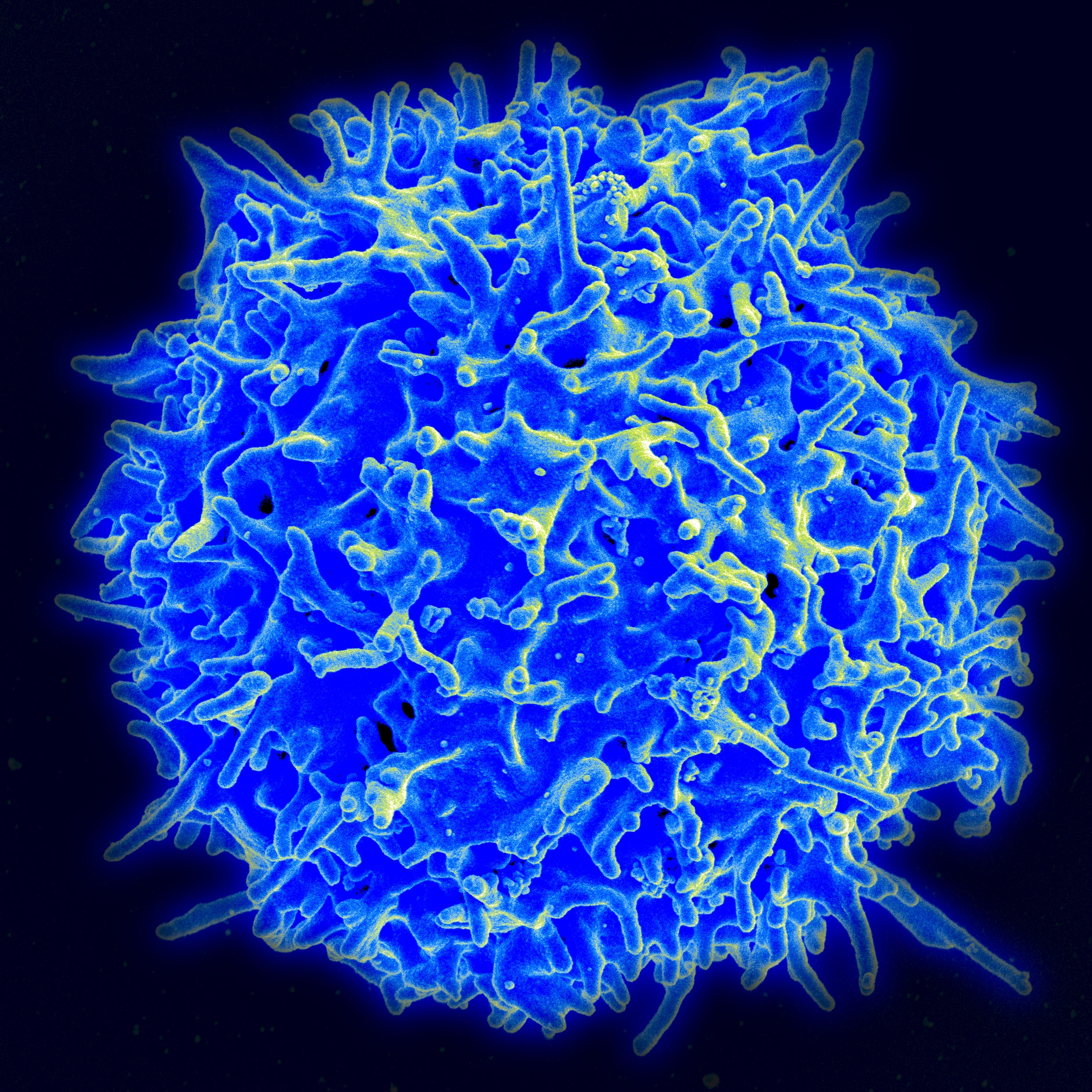
- Specialty: Infectious diseases, dermatology
- Symptoms: Skin ulcer
- Types: CANDF1,2,3,4,5,6,7,8 and 9j
- Diagnostic method: Thyroid function test, Liver function test
- Treatment: Systemic antifungal therapy

Chronic mucocutaneous candidiasis is an immune disorder of T cells. It is characterized by chronic infections with Candida that are limited to mucosal surfaces, skin, and nails. It can also be associated with other types of infections, such as human papilloma virus. An association with chromosome 2 has been identified.

== Types ==
Type	OMIM^{α}	Gene	Locus
CANDF1	114580	-	2p
CANDF2	212050	CARD9	9q34.3
CANDF3	607644	-	11
CANDF4	613108	CLEC7A	12p13.2-p12.3
CANDF5	613953	IL17RA	22q11
CANDF6	613956	IL17F	6p12
CANDF7	614162	STAT1	2q32
CANDF8	615527	TRAF3IP2	6q21
CANDF9	616445	IL17RC	3q25

== Signs and symptoms ==
The signs and symptoms of this condition are thickened skin, skin ulcer, dyspareunia, endocardium abnormality, vision problems, hepatitis, seizures, bloody urine, and meningitis.

=== Associated diseases or conditions ===
There are a number of disorders associated with chronic mucocutaneous candidiasis including endocrine dysfunctions, vitiligo, malabsorption syndromes, neoplasms, and others. In most patients, chronic mucocutaneous candidiasis is correlated to abnormalities in cell-mediated immunity (T-lymphocyte mediated response).

The T-lymphocytes fail to produce the necessary cytokines that are required for immunity against Candida. Current effective treatments include anti-fungal drugs and, for long-term remissions, restoration of cellular immunity.Patients with autosomal-dominant mucocutaneous candidiasis may be at risk for epidermoid esophageal cancer due to the nitrosamine compounds produced by chronic candida infections.

== Cause ==
Chronic mucocutaneous candidiasis can be inherited either autosomal dominant or autosomal recessive. There are 9 types of this condition with the first CANDF1 being located at 2p22.3-p21 (cytogenetically).

== Mechanism ==
The mechanism the human immune system has is normally to fight an infection (like Candida). Initially, Th17 cells are made by the immune system, which in turn produces interleukin-17 (IL-17). This induces inflammation and white blood cells confront infection.

Chronic mucocutaneous candidiasis mutations affect IL-17 by inhibiting its pathway. This in turn affects the human immune system's ability to fight infection, in total there are 9 possible types of this condition.

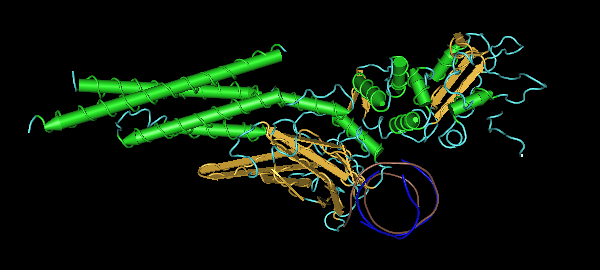
Stat1(CANDF7 mutation on Chromosome 2q32)

CHR 2

== Diagnosis ==
Chronic mucocutaneous candidiasis can be diagnosed in an affected individual via the following methods/tests:

- Thyroid function test
- Liver function test
- Cellular immunity test
- Skin biopsy
- Genetic testing

== Treatment ==
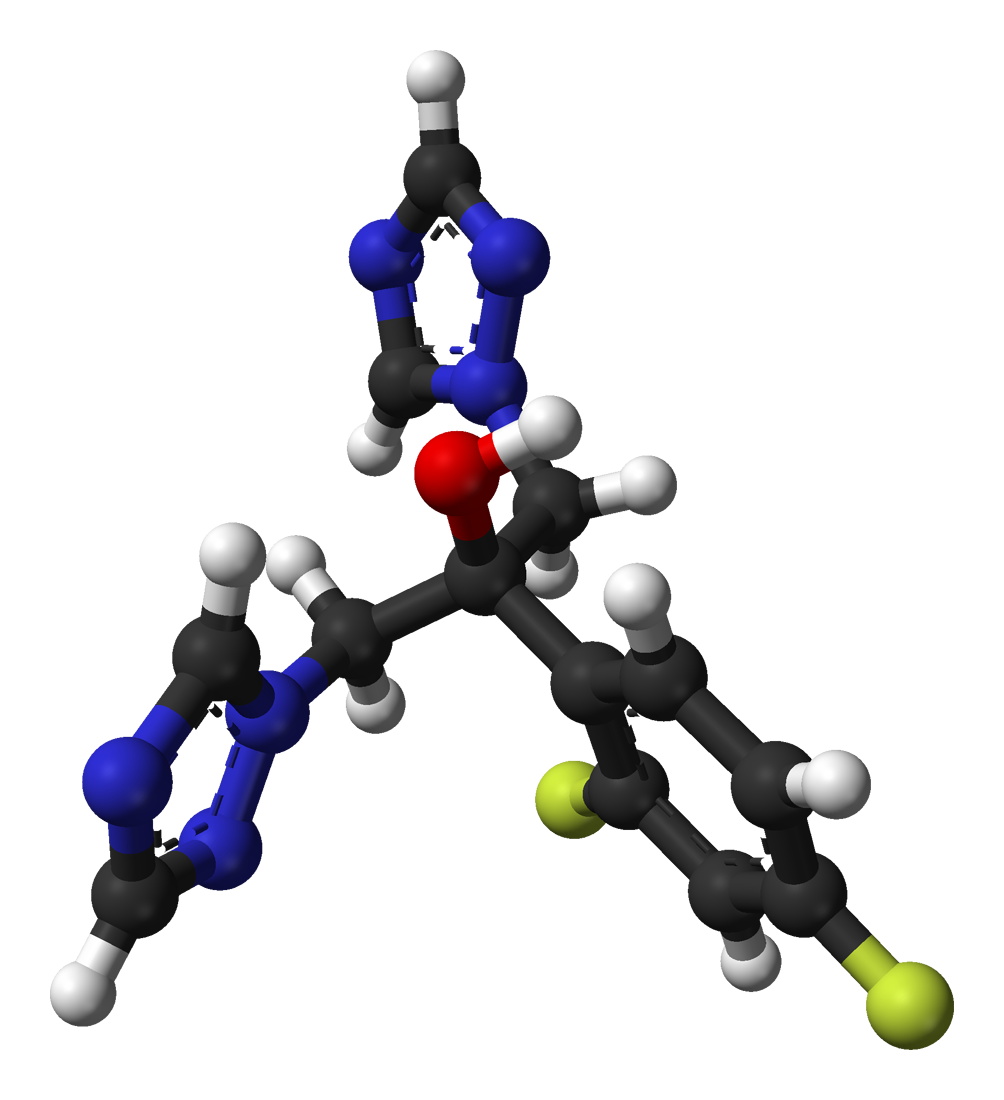
Fluconazole

Management for an individual with chronic mucocutaneous candidiasis consists of the following (relapse occurs once treatment is ceased, in many cases):

- Systemic anti-fungal therapy (e.g., Fluconazole)
- Transfer factor
- Combination therapy
- Screening (annually)

== See also ==
- Candidiasis
- List of cutaneous conditions

== Notes ==
Indicates 9 references to specific, numbered pages in the Online Mendelian Inheritance in Man database.
