= Bimekizumab =

Monoclonal antibody

Monoclonal antibody
- Type: Whole antibody
- Source: Humanized
- Target: IL17A, IL17F, IL17AF

Clinical data
- Trade names: Bimzelx
- Other names: UCB4940, bimekizumab-bkzx
- License data: US DailyMed: Bimekizumab
- Pregnancy category: AU: C
- Routes of administration: Subcutaneous
- ATC code: L04AC21 (WHO)

Legal status
- Legal status: AU: S4 (Prescription only); CA: ℞-only / Schedule D; US: ℞-only; EU: Rx-only

Identifiers
- CAS Number: 1418205-77-2
- DrugBank: DB12917
- UNII: 09495UIM6V
- KEGG: D11550

Chemical and physical data
- Formula: C_{6552}H_{10132}N_{1750}O_{2029}S_{42}
- Molar mass: 147229.87 g·mol^{−1}

Bimekizumab, sold under the brand name Bimzelx (/bɪmˈzɛlɪks/ bim-ZEL-iks), is a humanized anti-IL17A, anti-IL-17F, and anti-IL17AF monoclonal antibody that is used to treat plaque psoriasis, psoriatic arthritis, axial spondyloarthritis, ankylosing spondylitis, and hidradenitis suppurativa.

The most common side effects include upper respiratory tract infections (nose and throat infection) and oral candidiasis (thrush, a fungal infection in the mouth or throat). Injection site reactions were also common, reported in 3% of subjects.

Bimekizumab was approved for medical use in the European Union in August 2021 and in the US in October 2023. In November 2024, bimekizumab was approved by the US Food and Drug Administration for the treatment of active moderate-to-severe hidradenitis suppurativa in adults.

== Medical uses ==
In the EU, bimekizumab is indicated for the treatment of moderate to severe plaque psoriasis, active psoriatic arthritis, non-radiographic axial spondyloarthritis, and active ankylosing spondylitis.

== Society and culture ==
=== Names ===
Bimekizumab is the international nonproprietary name (INN).

== Research ==
Phase III trials have demonstrated that bimekizumab is superior to not only adalimumab but also secukinumab (PASI 100 at week 16: 61.7% vs 48.9% in BE RADIANT) and ustekinumab (PASI 90 at week 16: 85.0% vs 49.7% in BE VIVID) for the treatment of plaque psoriasis.

The approval for the treatment of active moderate-to-severe hidradenitis suppurativa (HS) in adults was supported by data from two Phase 3 studies, BE HEARD I and BE HEARD II, which evaluated the efficacy and safety of bimekizumab in the treatment of adults with moderate-to-severe HS.
