= Brodalumab =

Monoclonal antibody

Monoclonal antibody
- Type: Whole antibody
- Source: Human
- Target: Interleukin 17 receptor A

Clinical data
- Trade names: Siliq, Kyntheum, Lumicef
- Other names: KHK4827, AMG 827
- License data: US DailyMed: Brodalumab
- ATC code: L04AC12 (WHO)

Legal status
- Legal status: CA: ℞-only / Schedule D; US: ℞-only; EU: Rx-only; In general: ℞ (Prescription only)

Identifiers
- CAS Number: 1174395-19-7
- DrugBank: DB11776
- ChemSpider: none
- UNII: 6ZA31Y954Z
- KEGG: D10061

Chemical and physical data
- Formula: C_{6372}H_{9840}N_{1712}O_{1988}S_{52}
- Molar mass: 143905.93 g·mol^{−1}

Brodalumab, sold under the brand name Siliq in the US and Kyntheum in the EU, is a human monoclonal antibody designed for the treatment of inflammatory diseases.

In February 2017, it received US FDA approval to treat moderate to severe plaque psoriasis in people who have not improved with other treatments.

== Mechanism of action ==
Brodalumab binds to the interleukin-17 receptor and so prevents interleukin 17 (IL-17) from activating the receptor. This mechanism is similar to that of another anti-psoriasis antibody, ixekizumab, which however binds to IL-17 itself.

== History ==
Brodalumab was developed by Amgen, Inc. as AMG 827.

In 2013, it was in two phase III clinical trials for the treatment of moderate to severe psoriasis.

In November 2014, Amgen and AstraZeneca reported encouraging results for the compound. The companies stated that the compound met the primary endpoint showing superior skin clearance in a Phase III trial when compared to ustekinumab and a placebo.

However, in May 2015, Amgen announced that it was ending its participation in the co-development of the compound because of reports of patients having "events of suicidal ideation and behavior". AstraZeneca will be solely responsible for any future development and marketing of brodalumab in all territories except for certain Asian territories such as Japan, where Kyowa Hakko Kirin has rights to brodalumab and continued as KHK4827.

In September 2015, AstraZeneca announced a partnership with Valeant Pharmaceuticals in which Valeant took over exclusive rights to develop and commercialize brodalumab. In July 2016, the rights to commercialize brodalumab in Europe were sold to LEO Pharma.

In January 2016, a biologics license application (BLA) was submitted to the US FDA. Approval followed in February 2017.
