= Th17 pathogenic =

Th17 pathogenic refers to a distinct phenotype of Th17 cells which is associated with immunopathology. The development of the pathogenic phenotype can be shaped by various environmental stimuli and genetic factors. In humans, Th17 pathogenic cells are associated with diseases like multiple sclerosis (MS) or rheumatoid arthritis (RA) and in mice with experimental autoimmune encephalomyelitis (EAE). Th17 pathogenic cells are known to display pro-inflammatory features like expressing transcription factor T-bet and secreting cytokine IFNγ, resembling Th1-like phenotype. Th17 cells are a very heterogenous subset and can switch to display all T helper-like phenotype markers including those typical for Th2, Treg and Tfh.

Th17 cells gain the pathogenic phenotype by induction with pro-inflammatory cytokines IL-1β, IL-6 and IL-23 during their maturation. On the other hand, regulation of the Th17 immune response by TGFβ1 and IL-10 is known to inhibit Th17 pathogenicity. GM-CSF and IL-17 were recognised as the main effector cytokines secreted by Th17 pathogenic cells that promote the development of immunopathology.

== Key molecules in Th17 pathogenic development ==
=== Foxo1 ===
An important molecule in the Th17 pathogenic phenotype generation is the transcription factor Foxo1. Foxo1 inhibits hallmark Th17 transcription factor RORγt from enhancing the expression of the IL-1 and IL-23 receptors. Therefore, the Foxo1 deficient function results in over-expression of IL-1R and IL-23R which are one of the drivers of the Th17 pathogenic development. This inhibition of Foxo1 could be done through multiple mechanisms including miRNA regulation or activation of SGK1 kinase, which reacts to higher levels of NaCl in the body. It is suggested that high consumption of a salty diet can lead to the development of Th17 pathogenic cells.

=== RBPJ ===
RBPJ transcriptional regulator involved in the Notch signalling pathway promotes Th17 pathogenicity by activating the expression of IL23R and repressing the expression of IL-10. The following higher responsiveness to IL-23 stimulation, which is one of the key cytokines involved in Th17 pathogenic switch, and reduced production of regulatory anti-inflammatory IL-10 result in the phenotype change. Mice with RBPJ deficiency have less severe manifestations and faster recovery from experimental autoimmune encephalomyelitis due to fewer Th17 cells developing the pathogenic phenotype.

=== CD5L ===
CD5L protein is a lipid metabolism regulator. In Th17 cells CD5L is predominantly expressed in non-pathogenic ones, where it functions as a pathogenicity repressor. Loss of CD5L expression drives Th17 cells to the pathogenic phenotype through the subsequent changes in lipid metabolism, and through the alteration of binding of the transcription factor RORγt to its target genes. More specifically, the CD5L deficit in Th17 cells switches the fatty acid balance in favour of saturated fatty acids (SFA) and limits cholesterol synthesis, RORγt is regulated by polyunsaturated fatty acid (PUFA) derived ligands whose availability in CD5L deficient cells is limited. CD5L expression can be lost in response to IL23R signalling.

== Th17 pathogenic in disease ==
=== Rheumatoid arthritis ===
Th17 pathogenic cells were identified as one of the cross-reactive cell subsets causing inflammatory synovial and cartilage disruption in joints causing rheumatoid arthritis disease. Th17 pathogenic cells express CCR6 chemokine molecule which after binding to its ligand promotes the migration to the joints and synovial tissue. The non-immune cells of synovial tissue are expressing the CCR6 ligands upon pro-inflammatory stimulation with IL-17, IL-1β, GM-CSF cytokines secreted by originally recruited immune cells, this is one of the mechanisms of the vicious circle of chronic joint inflammation in rheumatoid arthritis.

=== Multiple sclerosis ===
Th17 pathogenic cells were identified as one of the cross-reactive cell subsets disrupting the protective myelin sheath of neurons causing multiple sclerosis disease. Elevated levels of IL-17, IL-23, GM-CSF pro-inflammatory cytokines associated with Th17 pathogenic cells play a key role in demyelination and consequent multiple sclerosis manifestations. The migration of Th17 pathogenic cells to the CNS is critical in multiple sclerosis progression and it is mediated by CCR6 chemokine expressed on Th17 pathogenic cell surface.

=== Obesity ===
Microbiota dysbiosis, disruption of metabolic functions and homeostasis with subsequent high levels of saturated fatty acids (SFA) and cholesterol present in the gastrointestinal tract of obese patients are leading to chronic low-grade inflammation which has an impact on Th17 pathogenic formation. ACC1 in Th17 cells is over-activated in response to a high-fat diet. ACC1 regulates the development of pathogenic phenotype by altering the fatty acid metabolism and the availability of lipid-derived regulatory partners of transcription factors including RORγt. The function of important molecules in Th17 pathogenic development like IL-23, CD5L, ACC1 and others are altered in patients with obesity contributing to the phenotype switch.

Other diseases associated with the involvement of Th17 pathogenic cells are psoriasis, diabetes, systemic lupus erythematosus and others.
