= IL17RB =

Protein-coding gene in the species Homo sapiens

Identifiers
- Aliases: IL17RB, CRL4, EVI27, IL17BR, IL17RH1, interleukin 17 receptor B
- External IDs: OMIM: 605458; MGI: 1355292; GeneCards: IL17RB
Available structures
PDB	Ortholog search: PDBe RCSB
PDB	List of PDB id codes 3VBC

Gene location (Human)
Chr.	Chromosome 3 (human)
Band	3p21.1	Start	53,846,568 bp
Band	3p21.1	End	53,865,794 bp

Gene location (Mouse)
Chr.	Chromosome 14 (mouse)
Band	14 A3|14 18.39 cM	Start	29,718,092 bp
Band	14 A3|14 18.39 cM	End	29,730,853 bp
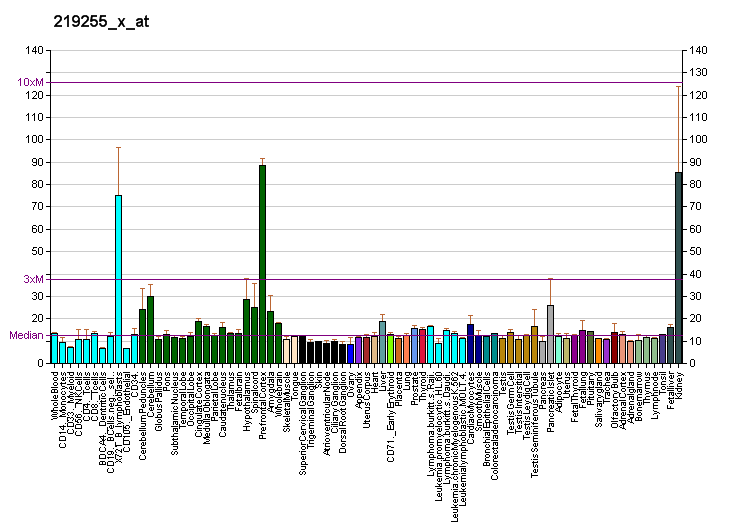
RNA expression pattern
Bgee	Human / Mouse (ortholog); Top expressed in: kidney tubule; right lobe of liver; human kidney; mucosa of ileum; right hemisphere of cerebellum; glomerulus; amygdala; metanephric glomerulus; caudate nucleus; nucleus accumbens / Top expressed in: secondary oocyte; primary oocyte; thymus; zygote; right kidney; proximal tubule; pharynx; morula; vestibular membrane of cochlear duct; Paneth cell; More reference expression data
BioGPS	More reference expression data
Gene ontology
Molecular function	cytokine receptor activity; interleukin-17 receptor activity
Cellular component	cytoplasm; integral component of membrane; extracellular region; cell surface; integral component of plasma membrane; membrane; plasma membrane
Biological process	defense response; positive regulation of inflammatory response; regulation of cell growth; interleukin-17-mediated signaling pathway
Sources:Amigo / QuickGO
Orthologs
Databases	NCBI: entry; OMA: entry
Species	Human	Mouse
Entrez	55540	50905
Ensembl	ENSG00000056736	ENSMUSG00000015966
UniProt	Q9NRM6	Q9JIP3
RefSeq (mRNA)	NM_018725; NM_172234	NM_019583
RefSeq (protein)	NP_061195	NP_062529
Location (UCSC)	Chr 3: 53.85 – 53.87 Mb	Chr 14: 29.72 – 29.73 Mb
PubMed search
- Wikidata
View/Edit Human	View/Edit Mouse

Interleukin-17 receptor B is a protein that in humans is encoded by the IL17RB gene.

The protein encoded by this gene is a cytokine receptor. This receptor specifically binds to IL17B and IL17E (IL25), but does not bind to IL17(A) or IL17C. This receptor has been shown to mediate the activation of NF-κB and the production of IL8 induced by IL17E. The expression of the rat counterpart of this gene was found to be significantly up-regulated during intestinal inflammation, which suggested the immunoregulatory activity of this receptor.

== See also ==
- Interleukin-17 receptor
