= IL-25 =

IL-25 or IL 25 can refer to:

- Interleukin 25
- Illinois's 25th congressional district, an obsolete district
- Illinois Route 25
