= BPM RNA motif =

Non-coding RNA motif

BPM RNA motif is a conserved non-coding RNA motif identified in plants. It was discovered through comparative genomic analysis of rosid species and is associated with homologs of the BTB-POZ and MATH (BPM) domain protein genes BPM1 and BPM2.

== Discovery and distribution ==
The BPM RNA motif was identified by Sack et al. in a comparative genomics study of structured RNAs in plants. The motif was detected in 31 species belonging to the rosid clade and occurs within the second intron of BPM1 and BPM2 homologs.

== Structure ==
The motif is predicted to form a conserved stem-loop structure interrupted by one small and two large bulge loops. Conserved alternative splice sites occur within the motif, including cassette exon-associated 3′ and 5′ splice sites. In Arabidopsis thaliana, the motif overlaps a cassette exon that participates in alternative splicing.

Although the original structural prediction appeared promising, subsequent homology searches provided limited covariation support for the proposed secondary structure.

== Function ==
The biological function of the BPM RNA motif has not been experimentally validated. Sack et al. proposed that the motif may act as a cis-regulatory RNA element involved in alternative splicing of BPM1 and BPM2 transcripts.

In Arabidopsis thaliana, inclusion of the cassette exon associated with the motif generates transcript isoforms subject to nonsense-mediated decay (NMD). Because BPM proteins are involved in ubiquitin-mediated regulation of transcription factors controlling flowering, seed development, and abiotic stress responses, the motif has been hypothesized to contribute to regulation of BPM gene expression through modulation of cassette exon inclusion.

== Biological context ==
BPM proteins form part of Cullin E3 ubiquitin ligase complexes and interact with several transcription factor families, including AP2/ERF, homeobox-leucine zipper, and R2R3 MYB proteins. Through these interactions, BPM proteins contribute to developmental and stress-response pathways in plants.
