= Interleukin 17F =

Mammalian protein found in Homo sapiens

IL17F

Identifiers
- Aliases: IL17F, CANDF6, IL-17F, ML-1, ML1, interleukin 17F, IL17A
- External IDs: OMIM: 606496; MGI: 2676631; GeneCards: IL17F
Available structures
PDB	Ortholog search: PDBe RCSB
PDB	List of PDB id codes 1JPY, 3JVF

Gene location (Human)
Chr.	Chromosome 6 (human)
Band	6p12.2	Start	52,236,681 bp
Band	6p12.2	End	52,244,500 bp

Gene location (Mouse)
Chr.	Chromosome 1 (mouse)
Band	1|1 A4	Start	20,847,370 bp
Band	1|1 A4	End	20,860,841 bp
RNA expression pattern
Bgee	Human / Mouse (ortholog); Top expressed in: testicle; gonad; bone marrow cell; appendix; tonsil; left testis; lymph node; right testis; duodenum; urinary bladder / Top expressed in: zygote; secondary oocyte; embryo; embryo; Rostral migratory stream; blastocyst; primary oocyte; proximal tubule; tail of embryo; right kidney; More reference expression data
BioGPS	n/a
Gene ontology
Molecular function	cytokine activity; protein binding; protein homodimerization activity; cytokine binding; cytokine receptor binding
Cellular component	extracellular region; extracellular space
Biological process	negative regulation of angiogenesis; positive regulation of cytokine production involved in inflammatory response; cartilage development; positive regulation of transcription by RNA polymerase II; regulation of transforming growth factor beta receptor signaling pathway; inflammatory response; regulation of signaling receptor activity; cytokine-mediated signaling pathway; interleukin-17-mediated signaling pathway
Sources:Amigo / QuickGO
Orthologs
Databases	NCBI: entry; OMA: entry
Species	Human	Mouse
Entrez	112744	257630
Ensembl	ENSG00000112116	ENSMUSG00000041872
UniProt	Q96PD4	Q7TNI7
RefSeq (mRNA)	NM_052872; NM_172343	NM_145856
RefSeq (protein)	NP_443104	NP_665855
Location (UCSC)	Chr 6: 52.24 – 52.24 Mb	Chr 1: 20.85 – 20.86 Mb
PubMed search
- Wikidata
View/Edit Human	View/Edit Mouse

Interleukin 17F (IL-17F) is a signaling protein in humans, which is encoded by the IL17F gene and is considered a pro-inflammatory cytokine. This protein belongs to the interleukin 17 family and is mainly produced by the T helper 17 cells after their stimulation with interleukin 23. However, IL-17F can also be produced by a wide range of cell types, including innate immune cells and epithelial cells.

The IL17F gene is located on chromosome 6p12 and was discovered in 2001. This cytokine can be secreted as a disulfide-linked homodimer or heterodimer.

== Function and signaling ==
IL-17F is involved in the development of inflammation and host defense against infection by inducing the expression of genes that encode other proinflammatory cytokines, such as tumor necrosis factor, interleukin 1, interleukin 6 and some members of the colony-stimulating factor family. IL-17F can also induce expression of chemokines, such as CXCL1, CXCL5, interleukin 8, CCL7 and others, thereby promoting inflammation and neutrophil recruitment. IL-17F signaling can also lead to antimicrobial peptide and matrix metalloproteinase production. The target cells of IL-17F are epithelial cells, fibroblasts, keratinocytes, synoviocytes, and endothelial cells. These cells express IL-17RA and IL-17RC, which are the receptors IL-17F binds. IL-17F shows a broad tissue expression pattern, including the lungs, where it may be associated with the pathogenesis of asthma. IL-17F employs Act1 and TRAF6 as its signal transducers to induce the expression of the pro-inflammatory cytokines and chemokines in many different cell types. IL-17F signaling also activates the MAP kinase pathway and leads to the activation of NF-κB, MAPK-AP-1 and C/EBP.

IL-17F is highly (55%) homologous to interleukin-17A (IL-17A). These two molecules bind to the same receptors and are very likely to have similar biological functions. IL-17A and IL-17F are often co-expressed. However, IL-17F is a weaker inducer of pro-inflammatory cytokine expression and is produced by a wider range of cell types than IL-17A. Another difference lies in the binding affinities for their receptors: IL-17A binds more strongly to IL-17RA and IL-17F to IL-17RC.

The interleukin-17 family members are among the effector cytokines of Th17 immune response. This immune response protects hosts from pathogens at epithelial and mucosal tissues, including the skin, lung, and intestine. The Th17-type immune response is directed primarily against extracellular bacteria. IL-17F as an effector cytokine of Th17 cells is involved in host defense against bacterial infections. It has many mechanisms by which it helps resist bacteria. IL-17F has the ability to stimulate the production of defensins and other antimicrobial peptides; it can also resist bacteria through production of pro-inflammatory cytokines and chemokines that attract neutrophils and other effector cells.

== Clinical significance ==
IL-17F is a proinflammatory cytokine associated with many diseases. It very often plays crucial role in autoimmune diseases.

One of the diseases associated with IL-17F is psoriasis. Levels of IL-17F, as well as the levels of IL-17A, are increased in psoriatic skin and in synovial cells in psoriatic arthritis. IL-17F is capable of inducing cartilage matrix release and can inhibit the synthesis of new cartilage matrix. The monoclonal antibody bimekizumab against IL-17A and IL-17F is approved in Europe for the treatment of psoriasis; it may also be useful in the treatment of ankylosing spondylitis.

IL-17F plays an important role in asthma and allergic airway inflammation. IL-17F has been well characterized both in vitro and in vivo to have a pro-inflammatory role in asthma. IL-17F was originally found in bronchoalveolar lavage cells from patients with allergic asthma upon ragweed allergen stimulation. The expression level of IL-17F correlates with the severity of the disease. Overexpression of this cytokine in the airway is associated with neutrophilia, secretion of many cytokines, increased airway activity, and mucus hypersecretion.

IL-17F is also involved in the pathogenesis of intestinal inflammation. Expression of IL-17F in the colon is associated with inflammatory bowel disease, and this inducible IL-17F expression is significantly higher in Crohn's disease than in ulcerative colitis.

Increased expression of IL-17F is also found in neuronal inflammation—specifically, in active lesion sites in experimental autoimmune encephalitis, an animal model of multiple sclerosis. IL-17F together with IL-17A contributes to chronic inflammation.

IL-17F may also be involved in tumorigenesis and associated with the tumor microenvironment (TME), as pro-tumor and anti-tumor functions have been ascribed to the related protein IL-17A. However, a role for IL-17F in tumor development has not been well described.
