= IL17RD =

Identifiers
- Aliases: IL17RD, HH18, IL-17RD, IL17RLM, SEF, interleukin 17 receptor D
- External IDs: OMIM: 606807; MGI: 2159727; GeneCards: IL17RD

Gene location (Human)
Chr.	Chromosome 3 (human)
Band	3p14.3	Start	57,089,982 bp
Band	3p14.3	End	57,170,306 bp

Gene location (Mouse)
Chr.	Chromosome 14 (mouse)
Band	14|14 A3	Start	26,760,898 bp
Band	14|14 A3	End	26,829,243 bp
RNA expression pattern
Bgee	Human / Mouse (ortholog); Top expressed in: secondary oocyte; lactiferous duct; ganglionic eminence; corpus epididymis; tail of epididymis; parietal pleura; germinal epithelium; sperm; ventricular zone; tendon of biceps brachii / Top expressed in: vestibular sensory epithelium; primitive streak; tail of embryo; Bowman's capsule; secondary oocyte; primary oocyte; zygote; mandibular prominence; vestibular membrane of cochlear duct; maxillary prominence; More reference expression data
BioGPS	n/a
Gene ontology
Molecular function	interleukin-17 receptor activity
Cellular component	cytoplasm; integral component of membrane; Golgi apparatus; membrane; Golgi membrane; plasma membrane; integral component of plasma membrane; nucleoplasm
Biological process	MAPK cascade; cytokine-mediated signaling pathway
Sources:Amigo / QuickGO
Orthologs
Databases	NCBI: entry; OMA: entry
Species	Human	Mouse
Entrez	54756	171463
Ensembl	ENSG00000144730	ENSMUSG00000040717
UniProt	Q8NFM7	Q8JZL1
RefSeq (mRNA)	NM_017563; NM_001318864	NM_027265; NM_134437
RefSeq (protein)	NP_001305793; NP_060033	NP_602319
Location (UCSC)	Chr 3: 57.09 – 57.17 Mb	Chr 14: 26.76 – 26.83 Mb
PubMed search
- Wikidata
View/Edit Human	View/Edit Mouse

Interleukin 17 receptor D (also known as Sef) is a protein that in humans is encoded by the IL17RD gene.

This gene encodes a membrane protein belonging to the interleukin-17 receptor (IL-17R) protein family. Alternate splicing generates multiple transcript variants encoding distinct isoforms. IL-17RD has been described to limit fibroblast growth factor receptor (FGFR) signaling and to be a part of the IL-17 receptor signaling complex.

== Identification ==
IL-17RD was initially discovered during a large-scale in situ hybridization screen for genes regulating zebrafish embryogenesis. It was identified as a part of a synexpression group (genes with similar spatio-temporal expression) with negative regulators of fibroblast growth factor (FGF) and termed Sef (similar expression to FGF genes). The name was later changed to IL-17RD due to its sequence similarity to other IL-17 receptors. It was further determined that IL-17RD co-immunoprecipitates with FGF receptor (FGFR) and inhibits FGF signaling at the level of signal transduction and not by interfering with the ligand or its binding to FGFR.

== Structure ==
IL-17RD is a type I transmembrane protein containing extracellular Ig-like domain followed by a fibronectin type III domain, a short transmembrane domain of ~20 amino acids, and an intracellular SEFIR domain which was identified in IL-17 receptors and some soluble factors involved in IL-17 signaling. The SEFIR domain contains a region with sequence similarity to the TIR domain, which is characteristic of Toll-like receptors (TLRs), receptors of the interleukin 1 family, and adaptor proteins involved in the signaling pathways of these receptors. The regions within SEFIR that can be found in the TIR domain include box 1 and box 2.

== IL-17RD in development ==
IL-17RD (Sef) was identified as part of a group of genes involved in FGF signaling in zebrafish and Xenopus laevis embryo. Injection of 1-cell stage embryo with sef mRNA lead to ventralization of the embryo, a similar effect observed after injection with XFD (a dominant negative of FGF receptor), suggesting its function as a negative regulator of FGF receptor signaling. Co-immunoprecipitation assay revealed that the intracellular part, but not the SEFIR domain, is critical for IL-17RD association with FGFR. One of the pathways activated by stimulation of FGFR is Ras/MAPK (the rest being PI3/AKT and PLCγ). Injection of embryos with high amounts of Ras, Raf or MEK causes cell cycle arrest, which can be rescued by co-injection of IL-17RD, further supporting the role of IL-17RD in negative regulation of FGFR signaling. Moreover, IL-17RD appears to regulate FGF signaling at the level of downstream signaling, not the receptor, since overexpression of FGF or FGFR does not cause cell cycle arrest. Taken together IL-17RD seems to negatively regulate FGFR signaling by limiting MAPK signaling via its intracellular domain.

== IL-17RD in inflammation ==
=== IL-17 signaling ===
The IL-17 receptor family belongs to a group of structurally similar receptors with a distinctive SEFIR (Sef and IL-17R) domain. The founding member, IL-17RA, along with IL-17RC serve as a receptor complex for IL-17. IL-17 is a proinflammatory cytokine mainly produced by Th17 subset of T cells and plays an important role in extracellular pathogen elimination as well as several autoinflammatory diseases (such as psoriasis or rheumatoid arthritis). IL-17RD has been reported to associate and co-localize with IL-17RA, mediate IL-17 signaling, and interact with TRAF6 (an IL-17 downstream molecule). Moreover, deletion of IL-17RD intracellular domain has a dominant negative effect and suppresses IL-17 signaling. In contrast, deletion of extracellular domain had no effect on IL-17 signaling. However, full-body IL-17RD knockout mice do not present with any apparent phenotype. This might be accounted for by the presence of IL-17RC which to an extent substitutes IL-17RD. IL-17RC or IL-17RD deletion fails to protect against imiquimod-induced psoriasis.

=== TLR signaling ===
Since the SEFIR domain contains a TIR domain, the possible role of IL-17RD in TLR signaling was investigated. One study discovered that IL-17RD interacts with TIR adaptor proteins (such as MyD88, Mal, and TRIF) following TLR stimulation. Additionally, this interaction was abolished in IL-17RD which lacks the SEFIR domain. The study concluded that IL-17RD targets TLR-induced pro-inflammatory pathways and inhibits signaling upstream of NF-κB and IRF3.

=== TNF signaling ===
One study reported that TNF induces IL-17RD expression, which then serves as a feedback loop inhibiting the activation of TNF-activated NF-κB. Another study focusing on renal cells describes IL-17RD to associate with TNFR2, but not TNFR1, to augment NF-κB activation. The contrasting results suggest different roles of IL-17RD in various tissues.
