= Interleukin-17A =

Protein-coding gene in the species Homo sapiens

IL17A

Identifiers
- Aliases: IL17A, CTLA8, IL-17, IL-17A, IL17, CTLA-8, interleukin 17A, ILA17, Interleukin 17A
- External IDs: OMIM: 603149; MGI: 107364; GeneCards: IL17A
Available structures
PDB	Ortholog search: PDBe RCSB
PDB	List of PDB id codes 2VXS, 4HR9, 4HSA, 4QHU, 5HHV, 5HHX

Gene location (Human)
Chr.	Chromosome 6 (human)
Band	6p12.2	Start	52,186,375 bp
Band	6p12.2	End	52,190,638 bp

Gene location (Mouse)
Chr.	Chromosome 1 (mouse)
Band	1|1 A4	Start	20,801,129 bp
Band	1|1 A4	End	20,804,720 bp
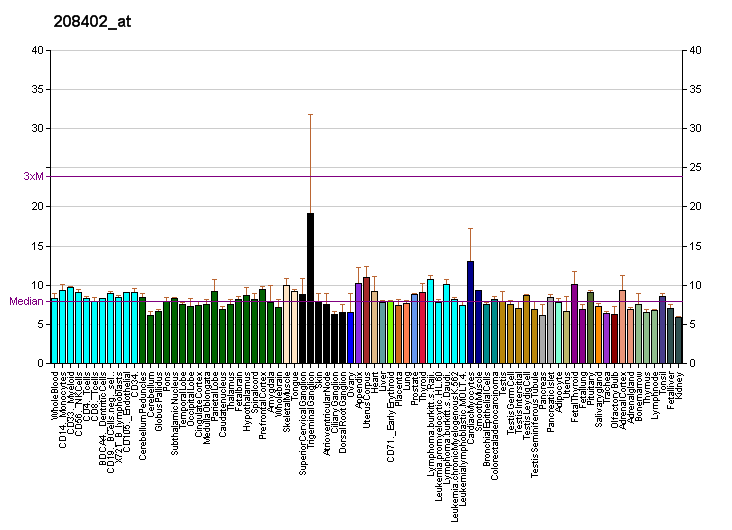

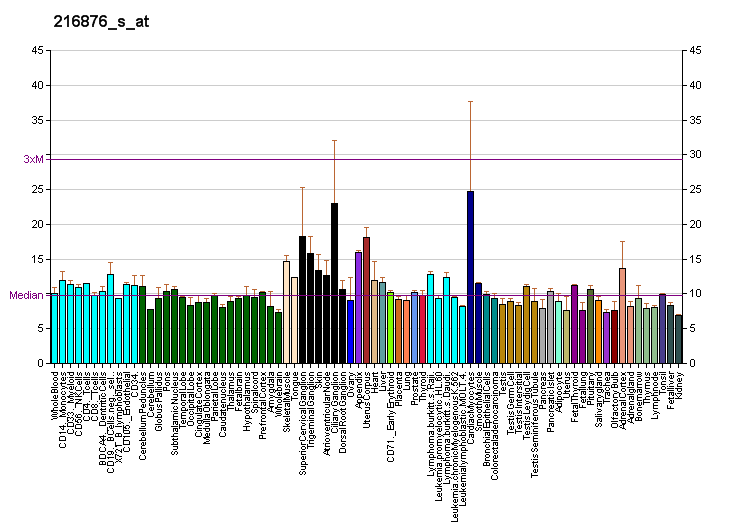
RNA expression pattern
Bgee	Human / Mouse (ortholog); Top expressed in: appendix; pylorus; palpebral conjunctiva; gallbladder; mucosa of transverse colon; tonsil; human penis; duodenum; urinary bladder; smooth muscle tissue / Top expressed in: lumbar subsegment of spinal cord; tibiofemoral joint; CA3 field; gastrula; digastric muscle; right ventricle; submandibular gland; carotid body; lumbar spinal ganglion; ileum; More reference expression data
BioGPS	More reference expression data
Gene ontology
Molecular function	cytokine activity; protein binding
Cellular component	external side of plasma membrane; extracellular region; extracellular space
Biological process	positive regulation of cytokine production involved in inflammatory response; cell-cell signaling; positive regulation of osteoclast differentiation; cell death; defense response to fungus; cellular response to interleukin-1; immune response; fibroblast activation; positive regulation of interleukin-23 production; positive regulation of transcription by RNA polymerase II; apoptotic process; inflammatory response; regulation of signaling receptor activity; cytokine-mediated signaling pathway; interleukin-17-mediated signaling pathway; granulocyte migration
Sources:Amigo / QuickGO
Orthologs
Databases	NCBI: entry; OMA: entry
Species	Human	Mouse
Entrez	3605	16171
Ensembl	ENSG00000112115	ENSMUSG00000025929
UniProt	Q16552	Q62386
RefSeq (mRNA)	NM_002190	NM_010552
RefSeq (protein)	NP_002181	NP_034682
Location (UCSC)	Chr 6: 52.19 – 52.19 Mb	Chr 1: 20.8 – 20.8 Mb
PubMed search
- Wikidata
View/Edit Human	View/Edit Mouse

Interleukin-17A is a protein that in humans is encoded by the IL17A gene. In rodents, IL-17A used to be referred to as CTLA8, after the similarity with a viral gene (O40633).

== Function ==
The protein encoded by this gene is a proinflammatory cytokine produced by activated T cells. This cytokine regulates the activities of NF-kappaB and mitogen-activated protein kinases. This cytokine can stimulate the expression of IL6 and cyclooxygenase-2 (PTGS2/COX-2), as well as enhance the production of nitric oxide (NO).

== Discovery ==
IL-17A, often referred to as IL-17, was originally discovered at transcriptional level by Rouvier et al. in 1993 from a rodent T-cell hybridoma, derived from the fusion of a mouse cytotoxic T cell clone and a rat T cell lymphoma. Human and mouse IL-17A were cloned a few years later by Yao and Kennedy. Lymphocytes including CD4+, CD8+, gamma-delta T (γδ-T), invariant NKT and innate lymphoid cells (ILCs) are primary sources of IL-17A. Non-T cells, such as neutrophils, have also been reported to produce IL-17A under certain circumstances. IL-17A producing T helper cells (Th17 cells) are a distinct lineage from the Th1 and Th2 CD4+ lineages and the differentiation of Th17 cells requires STAT3 and RORC. IL-17 receptor A (IL-17RA) was first isolated and cloned from mouse EL4 thymoma cells and the bioactivity of IL-17A was confirmed by stimulating the transcriptional factor NF-kappa B activity and interleukin-6 (IL-6) secretion in fibroblasts. IL-17RA pairs with IL-17RC to allow binding and signaling of IL-17A, IL-17F, and IL-17AF.

== Clinical significance ==
High levels of this cytokine are associated with several chronic inflammatory diseases including rheumatoid arthritis, psoriasis and multiple sclerosis.

=== Autoimmune diseases ===
Multiple sclerosis (MS) is a neurological disease caused by immune cells, which attack and destroy the myelin sheath that insulates neurons in the brain and spinal cord. This disease and its animal model experimental autoimmune encephalomyelitis (EAE) have historically been associated with the discovery of Th17 cells. More current experiments on this animal model have also revealed that a key function of IL-17A in central nervous system (CNS) autoimmunity was to recruit IL-1β-secreting myeloid cells. These cells play a vital role in priming pathogenic Th17 cells, thus promoting the development of autoimmune disease. However, elevated expression of IL-17A in MS lesions as well as peripheral blood had been documented before the identification of Th17 cells. Human Th17 cells have been shown to efficiently transmigrate across the blood-brain barrier in multiple sclerosis lesions, promoting central nervous system inflammation.

Psoriasis is an auto-inflammatory skin disease characterized by circumscribed, crimson red, silver-scaled, plaque-like inflammatory lesions. Initially, psoriasis was considered to be a Th1-mediated disease since elevated levels of IFN-γ, TNF-α, and IL-12 was found in the serum and lesions of psoriasis patients. However, the finding of IL-17-producing cells as well as IL17A transcripts in the lesions of psoriatic patients suggested that Th17 cells may synergize with Th1 cells in driving the pathology in psoriasis. The levels of IL-17A in the synovium correlate with tissue damage, whereas levels of IFN-γ correlate with protection. IL-17A inhibitors have been widely used in treating psoriasis and psoriatic arthritis, although the newer drug bimekizumab that directly targets both IL-17A and IL-17F (thus also IL-17AF) has shown promise to be more effective in treating psoriasis by blocking all three known ligands of the IL-17RA/IL-17RC complex.

Th17 cells is also strongly associated rheumatoid arthritis (RA), a chronic disorder with symptoms include chronic joint inflammation, autoantibody production, which lead to the destruction of cartilage and bone. Direct clinical significance of IL-17A in RA comes from recent clinical trials which found that two anti-IL-17A antibodies, namely secukinumab and ixekizumab significantly benefit these patients. However, IL-17A inhibitors show worse response rates in RA than current frontline disease-modifying antirheumatic drugs (DMARD) for RA such as corticosteroids and TNFα inhibitors.

Th17 cells and IL-17 have also been linked to Crohn's disease (CD) and ulcerative colitis (UC), the two main forms of inflammatory bowel diseases (IBD). Th17 cells infiltrate massively to the inflamed tissue of IBD patients and both in vitro and in vivo studies have shown that Th17-related cytokines may initiate and amplify multiple pro-inflammatory pathways. Elevated IL-17A levels in IBD have been reported by several groups. Nonetheless, Th17 signature cytokines, such as IL-17A and IL-22, may target gut epithelial cells and promote the activation of regulatory pathways and confer protection in the gastrointestinal tract. To this end, recent clinical trials targeting IL-17A in IBD were negative and actually showed increased adverse events in the treatment arm. This data raised the question regarding the role of IL-17A in IBD pathogenesis and suggested that the elevated IL-17A might be beneficial for IBD patients.

Systemic lupus erythematosus, commonly referred as SLE or lupus, is a complex immune disorder affects the skin, joints, kidneys, and brain. Although the exact cause of lupus is not fully known, it has been reported that IL-17 and Th17 cells are involved in disease pathogenesis. It has been reported that serum IL-17 levels are also elevated in SLE patients compared to controls and the Th17 pathway has been shown to drive autoimmune responses in pre-clinical mouse models of lupus. More importantly, IL-17- and IL-17-producing cells have also been detected in kidney tissue and skin biopsies from SLE patients.

=== Lung diseases ===
Elevated levels of IL-17A have been found in the sputum and in bronchoalveolar lavage fluid of patients with asthma and a positive correlation between IL-17A production and asthma severity has been established. In murine models, treatment with dexamethasone inhibits the release of Th2-related cytokines but does not affect IL-17A production. Furthermore, Th17 cell-mediated airway inflammation and airway hyperresponsiveness are steroid resistant, indicating a potential role for Th17 cells in steroid-resistant asthma. However, a recent trial using anti-IL-17RA did not show efficacy in subjects with asthma.

Recent studies have suggested the involvement of immunological mechanisms in COPD. An increase in Th17 cells was observed in patients with COPD compared with current smokers without COPD and healthy subjects, and inverse correlations were found between Th17 cells with lung function. Gene expression profiling of bronchial brushings obtained from COPD patients also linked lung function to several Th17 signature genes such as SAA1, SAA2, SLC26A4 and LCN2. Animal studies have shown that cigarette smoke promotes pathogenic Th17 differentiation and induces emphysema, while blocking IL-17A using neutralizing antibody significantly decreased neutrophil recruitment and the pathological score of airway inflammation in tobacco-smoke-exposed mice.

=== Host defense ===
In host defense, IL-17A has been shown to be mostly beneficial against infection caused by extracellular bacteria and fungi. The primary function of Th17 cells appears to be control of the gut microbiota as well as the clearance of extracellular bacteria and fungi. IL-17A and IL-17 receptor signaling has been shown to be play a protective role in host defenses against many bacterial and fungal pathogens including Klebsiella pneumoniae, Mycoplasma pneumoniae, Candida albicans, Coccidioides posadasii, Histoplasma capsulatum, and Blastomyces dermatitidis. However, IL-17A seems to be detrimental in viral infection such as influenza through promoting neutrophilic inflammation.

The requirements of IL-17A and IL-17 receptor signaling in host defense were well documented and appreciated before the identification of Th17 cells as an independent T helper cell lineage. In experimental pneumonia models, IL-17A or IL-17RA knock mice have increased susceptibility to various Gram-negative bacteria, such as Klebsiella pneumoniae and Mycoplasma pneumoniae. In contrast, data suggest that IL-23 and IL-17A are not required for protection against primary infection by the intracellular bacteria Mycobacterium tuberculosis. Both the IL-17RA knock out mice and the IL-23p19 knock out mice cleared primary infection with M. tuberculosis. However, IL-17A is required for protection against primary infection with a different intracellular bacteria, Francisella tularensis.

Mouse model studies using the IL-17RA knock out mice and the IL-17A knock out mice with the murine adapted influenza strain (PR8) as well as the 2009 pandemic H1N1 strain [93] both support that IL-17A plays a detrimental role in mediating the acute lung injury.

The role of adaptive immune responses mediated by antigen specific Th17 has been investigated more recently. Antigen specific Th17 cells were also shown to recognize conserved protein antigens among different K. pneumoniae strains and provide broad-spectrum serotype-independent protection. Antigen specific CD4 T cells also limit nasopharyngeal colonization of S. pneumoniae in mouse models. Furthermore, immunization with pneumococcal whole cell antigen and several derivatives provided IL-17-mediated, but not antibody dependent, protection against S. pneumoniae challenge. In fungal infection, it has been shown an IL-17 producing clone with a TCR specific for calnexin from Blastomyces dermatitidis confers protection with evolutionary related fungal species including Histoplasma spp.

=== Cancer ===
In tumorigenesis, IL-17A has been shown to recruit myeloid derived suppressor cells (MDSCs) to dampen anti-tumor immunity. IL-17A can also enhance tumor growth in vivo through the induction of IL-6, which in turn activates oncogenic transcription factor signal transducer and activator of transcription 3 (STAT3) and upregulates pro-survival and pro-angiogenic genes in tumors. The exact role of IL-17A in angiogenesis has yet to be determined and current data suggest that IL-17A can promote or suppress tumor development. IL-17A seemed to facilitate development of colorectal carcinoma by fostering angiogenesis via promote VEGF production from cancer cells and it has been shown that IL-17A also mediates tumor resistance to anti-VEGF therapy through the recruitment of MDSCs.

However IL-17A KO mice were more susceptible to developing metastatic lung melanoma, suggesting that IL-17A can possibly promote the production of the potent antitumor cytokine IFN-γ, produced by cytotoxic T cells. Indeed, data from ovarian cancer suggest that Th17 cells are positively correlated with NK cell–mediated immunity and anti-tumor CD8 responses.

=== Ocular diseases ===
The presence of IL-17 has been proven in a number of ocular diseases associated with neovascularization. Elevated concentration of IL-17 have been shown in vitreous fluid during proliferative diabetic retinopathy. Increased rates of Th17 cells and higher concentrations of IL-17 have been observed in patients with age-related macular degeneration.

== As a drug target ==
The discovery of the key roles of IL-17A and IL-17A producing cells in inflammation, autoimmune diseases and host defense has led to the experimental targeting of the IL-17A pathway in animal models of diseases as well as in clinical trials in humans. Targeting IL-17A has been proven to be a good approach as anti-IL-17A is FDA approved for the treatment of psoriasis in 2015.

Secukinumab (anti-IL-17A) has been evaluated in psoriasis and the first report showing secukinumab is effective when compared with placebo was published in 2010. In 2015, the US Food and Drug Administration (FDA) and European Medicines Agency (EMA) approved anti-IL-17 for the treatment of psoriasis.

Ixekizumab (Taltz), another anti-IL-17A, was approved by the FDA and the EU for psoriasis in 2016. In 2017, it was approved for active psoriatic arthritis.

Other than the monoclonal antibodies, highly specific and potent inhibitors targeting Th17 specific transcription factor RORγt have been identified and found to be highly effective.

Vitamin D, a potent immunomodulator, has also been shown to suppress Th17 cell differentiation and function by several research groups. The active form of vitamin D has been found to 'severely impair' production of the IL17 and IL-17F cytokines by Th17 cells.

== See also ==
- Interleukin 17
