= MATH domain =

Binding domain of TRAFs

MATH
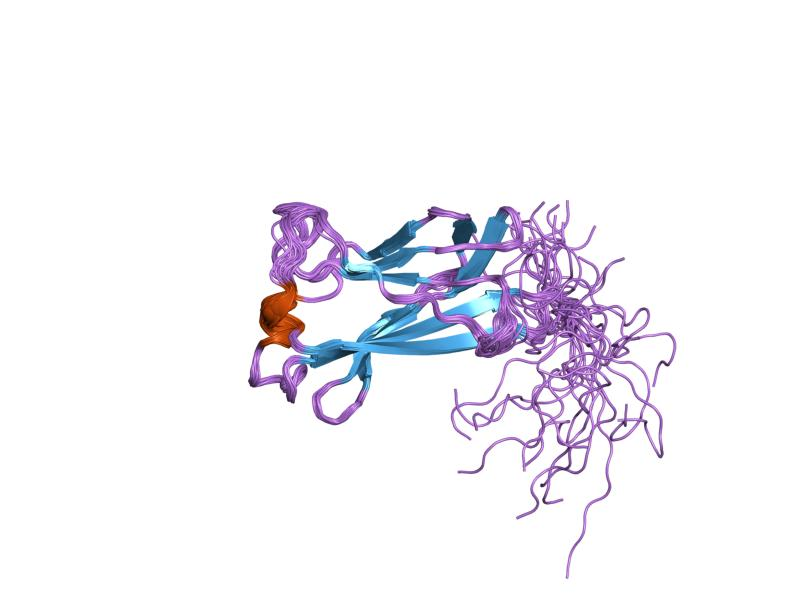
- solution structure of n-terminal domain of speckle-type poz protein

Identifiers
- Symbol: MATH
- Pfam: PF00917
- Pfam clan: CL0389
- InterPro: IPR002083
- SCOP2: 1qsc / SCOPe / SUPFAM
- CDD: cd00121
Available protein structures:
- Pfam: structures / ECOD
- PDB: RCSB PDB; PDBe; PDBj
- PDBsum: structure summary

The MATH domain, in molecular biology, is a binding domain that was defined originally by a region of homology between otherwise functionally unrelated domains, the intracellular TRAF-C domains of TRAF proteins and a C-terminal region of extracellular meprins A and B.

Although apparently functionally unrelated, intracellular TRAFs and extracellular meprins share a conserved region of about 180 residues, the meprin and TRAF homology (MATH) |domain. Meprins are mammalian tissue-specific metalloendopeptidases of the astacin family implicated in developmental, normal and pathological processes by hydrolysing a variety of proteins. Various growth factors, cytokines, and extracellular matrix proteins are substrates for meprins. They are composed of five structural domains: an N-terminal endopeptidase domain, a MAM domain, a MATH domain, an EGF-like domain and a C-terminal transmembrane region. Meprin A and B form membrane bound homo-tetramers whereas homo-oligomers of meprin A are secreted. A proteolytic site adjacent to the MATH domain, only present in meprin A, allows the release of the protein from the membrane.

TRAF proteins were first isolated through their ability to interact with TNF receptors. They promote cell survival by the activation of downstream protein kinases and, ultimately, transcription factors of the NF-κB and AP-1 family. The TRAF proteins are composed of 3 structural domains: a RING finger in the N-terminal part of the protein, one to seven TRAF zinc fingers in the middle and the MATH domain in the C-terminal part. The MATH domain is necessary and sufficient for self-association and receptor interaction. Through structural analysis, two consensus sequences recognised by the TRAF domain have been defined: a major one, [PSAT]x[QE]E and a minor one, PxQxxD.

The structure of the TRAF2 protein reveals a trimeric self-association of the MATH domain. The domain forms a new, light-stranded antiparallel beta sandwich structure. A coiled-coil region adjacent to the MATH domain is also important for the trimerisation. The oligomerisation is essential for establishing appropriate connections to form signalling complexes with TNF receptor-1. The ligand binding surface of TRAF proteins is located in beta-strands 6 and 7.

MATH domains are found in a large number of Arabidopsis thaliana sequences, where they often lie alongside BTB/POZ domains, a structural domain that also promotes oligomerisation.
