= TNF receptor associated factor =

Tumor necrosis factor receptor-associated factors (TRAFs) are a family of proteins that function as signaling molecules and are primarily involved in the regulation of inflammation, antiviral responses, and apoptosis. They perform their roles by interacting with various receptors that share a TRAF-binding motif. Mutations and disruptions in signaling pathways downstream of their receptors can cause immune-mediated diseases and conditions related to acute inflammation.

Currently, seven TRAF proteins have been characterized in mammals: TRAF1, TRAF2, TRAF3, TRAF4, TRAF5, TRAF6, and TRAF7.

== Structure ==
TRAF3, TRAF5, and TRAF6 share identical domains- the ring domain at the N-terminus, the Zinc-finger domain, TRAF-N domain, and the TRAF-C domain. Proteins 1, 4, and 7 differ slightly in the presence or absence of one domain, such as the WD40 repeat domain present on TRAF7 or the nuclear localization domain present on TRAF4. TRAF1 has three identified domains and lacks the ring domain found in every other protein.

Except for TRAF7, these proteins share a relatively conserved secondary structure, including a namesake C-terminal TRAF domain that mediates interactions with other signaling components such as the transmembrane TNF receptors and CD40.

== Functions ==
TRAF1 is abundant in lymphoid and myeloid cells to promote survival signaling, immune cell development, and appropriate CH8+ T-cell response. TRAF2 functions in support of TRAF1 by maintaining immune cell function and structure to avoid apoptosis and weakening of the survival signaling. TRAF6 and TRAF3 regulate NF-kB signaling as positive and negative regulators, respectively. TRAF4 is a major regulator of epithelial cells, while TRAF5 mainly functions as a regulator of lymphocytes by suppressing or up-regulating lymphocyte production depending on biological conditions or homeostasis maintenance. TRAF7 is the least studied, involved in several cellular pathways, including the regulation of TNF-α–NF-κB.

== Disease Relevance ==
TRAF proteins regulate antiviral defenses by controlling signaling pathways like the interferon, Nf-kB, and MAPK that are responsible for immune regulation. The same viruses that trigger the antiviral responses are able to revert the innate functions of TRAFs for the purpose of viral immunity via receptor modulations. These proteins have also shown to contribute to oncological diagnoses upon their mutations and disruptions of their native functions. For instance, TRAF4 has been implicated as a proliferator of cancer cells by posing as an adaptor for signaling cascades, such as ERK5.

== See also ==
- Tumor necrosis factors
