= Interleukin 17 =

Group of proteins

Interleukin 17 family

Identifiers
- Symbol: IL-17_fam
- Pfam: PF06083
- InterPro: IPR010345
Available protein structures:
- PDB: IPR010345 PF06083 (ECOD; PDBsum)
- AlphaFold: IPR010345; PF06083

Interleukin 17A

Identifiers
- Symbol: IL17A
- Alt. symbols: IL17, CTLA8
- NCBI gene: 3605
- HGNC: 5981
- OMIM: 603149
- RefSeq: NP_002181
- UniProt: Q16552

Other data
- Locus: Chr. 6 p12
Search for
- Structures: Swiss-model
- Domains: InterPro

Interleukin 17B

Identifiers
- Symbol: IL17B
- Alt. symbols: ZCOTO7
- NCBI gene: 27190
- HGNC: 5982
- OMIM: 604627
- RefSeq: NP_055258
- UniProt: Q9UHF5

Other data
- Locus: Chr. 5 q32-34
Search for
- Structures: Swiss-model
- Domains: InterPro

Interleukin 17C

Identifiers
- Symbol: IL17C
- Alt. symbols: CX2
- NCBI gene: 27189
- HGNC: 5983
- OMIM: 604628
- RefSeq: NP_037410
- UniProt: Q9P0M4

Other data
- Locus: Chr. 16 q24
Search for
- Structures: Swiss-model
- Domains: InterPro

Interleukin 17D

Identifiers
- Symbol: IL17D
- NCBI gene: 53342
- HGNC: 5984
- OMIM: 607587
- RefSeq: NP_612141
- UniProt: Q8TAD2

Other data
- Locus: Chr. 13 q11
Search for
- Structures: Swiss-model
- Domains: InterPro

Interleukin 17E

Identifiers
- Symbol: IL17E
- Alt. symbols: IL-25
- NCBI gene: 64806
- HGNC: 13765
- OMIM: 605658
- RefSeq: NP_073626
- UniProt: Q9H293

Other data
- Locus: Chr. 14 q11.2
Search for
- Structures: Swiss-model
- Domains: InterPro

Interleukin 17F
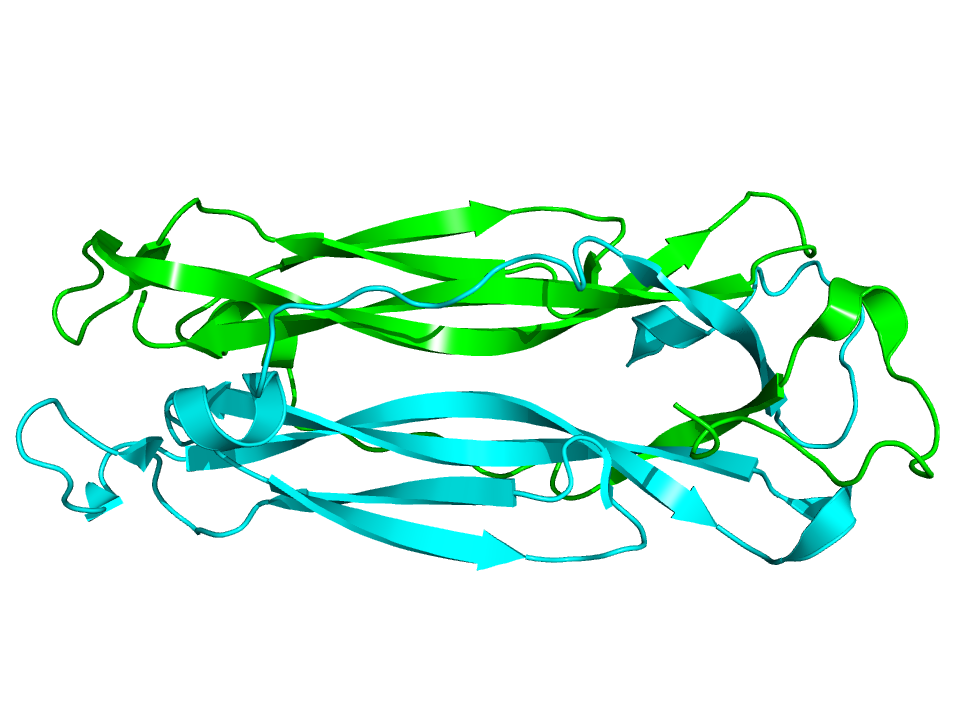
- Crystallographic structure of dimeric human IL-17f.

Identifiers
- Symbol: IL17F
- Alt. symbols: ML-1
- NCBI gene: 112744
- HGNC: 16404
- OMIM: 606496
- PDB: 1JPY
- RefSeq: NP_443104
- UniProt: Q96PD4

Other data
- Locus: Chr. 6 p12
Search for
- Structures: Swiss-model
- Domains: InterPro

Interleukin 17 family (IL17 family) is a family of pro-inflammatory cystine knot cytokines. They are produced by a group of T helper cell known as T helper 17 cell in response to their stimulation with IL-23. Originally, Th17 was identified in 1993 by Rouvier et al. who isolated IL17A transcript from a rodent T-cell hybridoma. The protein encoded by IL17A is a founding member of IL-17 family (see below). IL17A protein exhibits a high homology with a viral IL-17-like protein (O40633) encoded in the genome of T-lymphotropic rhadinovirus Herpesvirus saimiri. In rodents, IL-17A is often referred to as CTLA8.

The biologically active IL-17 interacts with type I cell surface receptor IL-17R. There are at least three variants of IL-17R referred to as IL17RA, IL17RB, and IL17RC. After binding to the receptor, IL-17 activates several signalling cascades that, in turn, lead to the induction of chemokines. Acting as chemoattractants, these chemokines recruit the immune cells, such as monocytes and neutrophils to the site of inflammation. Typically, the signaling events mentioned above follow an invasion of the body by pathogens. Promoting the inflammation, IL-17 acts in concert with tumor necrosis factor and interleukin-1. Moreover, an activation of IL-17 signalling is often observed in the pathogenesis of various autoimmune disorders, such as psoriasis.

== Family members ==
The IL-17 family in humans comprises IL17A (sometimes confusingly called "IL-17"), IL17B, IL17C, IL17D, IL17E and IL17F. IL-17E is also known as IL-25. All members of the IL-17 family have a similar protein structure. Their protein sequences contain four highly conserved cysteine residues. These conserved cysteine residues are critical to the right 3-dimensional shape of the entire protein molecule. To the reference, the members of the IL-17 family do not exhibit a significant sequence homology with other cytokines. Among IL-17 family members, the IL-17F isoforms 1 and 2 (ML-1) have the highest sequence homology with IL-17A (55 and 40%, respectively). They are followed by IL-17B, which has 29% similarity to IL-17A, IL-17D (25%), IL-17C (23%), and IL-17E (17%). In mammals, the sequences of these cytokines are highly conserved. For instance, the sequence homology between the corresponding human and mouse proteins is usually between 62 and 88%.

== Function ==
Numerous immune regulatory functions have been reported for the IL-17 family of cytokines, presumably due to their induction of many immune signaling molecules. The most notable role of IL-17 is its involvement in inducing and mediating proinflammatory responses. IL-17 is commonly associated with allergic responses. IL-17 induces the production of many other cytokines (such as IL-6, G-CSF, GM-CSF, IL-1β, TGF-β, TNF-α), chemokines (including IL-8, GRO-α, and MCP-1), and prostaglandins (e.g., PGE_{2}) from many cell types (fibroblasts, endothelial cells, epithelial cells, keratinocytes, and macrophages). IL-17 acts with IL-22 (produced mainly by T helper 22 cells in humans, but by T helper 17 cell in mice) to induce expression of antimicrobial peptide by keratinocytes.

The release of cytokines causes many functions, such as airway remodeling, a characteristic of IL-17 responses. The increased expression of chemokines attracts other cells including neutrophils but not eosinophils. IL-17 function is also essential to a subset of CD4+ T-Cells called T helper 17 (T_{h}17) cells. As a result of these roles, the IL-17 family has been linked to many immune-related/autoimmune diseases including rheumatoid arthritis, asthma, lupus, allograft rejection, anti-tumour immunity and recently psoriasis, multiple sclerosis, and intracerebral hemorrhage.

== Gene expression ==
The gene for human IL-17A is 1874 base pairs long and was cloned from CD4+ T cells. Each member of the IL-17 family has a distinct pattern of cellular expression. The expression of IL-17A and IL-17F appear to be restricted to a small group of activated T cells, and upregulated during inflammation. IL-17B is expressed in several peripheral tissues and immune tissues. IL-17C is also highly upregulated in inflammatory conditions, although in resting conditions is low in abundance. IL-17D is highly expressed in the nervous system and in skeletal muscle and IL-17E is found at low levels in various peripheral tissues.

Much progress has been made in the understanding of the regulation of IL-17. At first, Aggarwal et al. showed that production of IL-17 was dependent on IL-23. Later, a Korean group discovered that STAT3 and NF-κB signalling pathways are required for this IL-23-mediated IL-17 production. Consistent with this finding, Chen et al. showed that another molecule, SOCS3, plays an important role in IL-17 production. In the absence of SOCS3, IL-23-induced STAT3 phosphorylation is enhanced, and phosphorylated STAT3 binds to the promoter regions of both IL-17A and IL-17F increasing their gene activity. In contrast, some scientists believe IL-17 induction is independent of IL-23. Several groups have identified ways to induce IL-17 production both in vitro and in vivo by distinct cytokines, called TGF-β and IL-6, without the need for IL-23. Although IL-23 is not required for IL-17 expression in this situation, IL-23 may play a role in promoting survival and/or proliferation of the IL-17 producing T-cells. Recently, Ivanov et al. found that the thymus specific nuclear receptor, ROR-γ, directs differentiation of IL-17-producing T cells.

== Structure ==
IL-17(A) is a 155-amino acid protein that is a disulfide-linked, homodimeric, secreted glycoprotein with a molecular mass of 35 kDa. Each subunit of the homodimer is approximately 15-20 kDa. The structure of IL-17 consists of a signal peptide of 23 amino acids (aa) followed by a 123-aa chain region characteristic of the IL-17 family. An N-linked glycosylation site on the protein was first identified after purification of the protein revealed two bands, one at 15 kDa and another at 20 kDa. Comparison of different members of the IL-17 family revealed four conserved cysteines that form two disulfide bonds. IL-17 is unique in that it bears no resemblance to other known interleukins. Furthermore, IL-17 bears no resemblance to any other known proteins or structural domains.

The crystal structure of IL-17F, which is 50% homologous to IL-17A, revealed that IL-17F is structurally similar to the cystine knot family of proteins that includes the neurotrophins. The cystine knot fold is characterized by two sets of paired β-strands stabilized by three disulfide interactions. However, in contrast to the other cystine knot proteins, IL-17F lacks the third disulfide bond. Instead, a serine replaces the cysteine at this position. This unique feature is conserved in the other IL-17 family members. IL-17F also dimerizes in a fashion similar to nerve growth factor (NGF) and other neurotrophins.

== Role in psoriasis ==
Recent work suggests the IL-23/IL-17 pathway plays a major role in the autoimmune disorder psoriasis. In this condition, immune cells react to inflammatory molecules released within the skin around the joints and scalp. This response causes the epidermal cells to recycle more rapidly than usual, which leads to the formation of red, scaly lesions and chronic skin inflammation. Analysis of biopsies taken from lesions of psoriasis patients show an enrichment of cytotoxic T cells and neutrophils containing IL-17. This indicates an excessive infiltration of pro-inflammatory immune cells and IL-17 cytokines are associated with the development of psoriasis.

Studies conducted in mice demonstrate that removing either IL-23 or IL-17 decreases the progression of psoriasis. Mice injected with monoclonal antibodies targeting IL-17 blocked, or neutralized, down-stream signaling of this cytokine and decreased epidermal hyperplasia. Similarly, mice genetically modifying to not express IL-23 or IL-17 receptors significantly reduced psoriatic lesion development upon stimulation with the lesion-causing tumor promoter 12-O-tetradecanoylphorbol-13-acetate.

IL-17 promotes psoriasis by contributing to the inflammatory response that damages and overturns the keratinocyte cells of the epidermal layer. Inflammation begins with keratinocyte cells entering the final stages of their cell cycle, which activates immature dendritic cells (DC). Cytokines released from DCs stimulate dying keratinocytes to secrete TNF-alpha, IL-1 and IL-6 leading to the chemotaxis of T cells, natural killer cells and monocytes to the epidermis. These cells release IL-23 which induce Th17 cells to produce IL-17.

IL-17 interaction with IL-17RA receptors, abundant on the keratinocyte cell surface, incite epidermal cells to increase expression of IL-6, antimicrobial peptides, IL-8 and CCL20. Increased concentration of IL-6 alters the epidermal environment by decreasing the ability of T regulatory cells to control the behavior of Th17 cells. Reduced regulation allows uninhibited proliferation of Th17 cells and production of IL-17 in psoriatic lesions, augmenting IL-17 signaling. Antimicrobial peptides and IL-8 attract neutrophils to the site of injury where these cells remove damaged and inflamed keratinocyte cells. New immature DCs are also recruited by CCL20 via chemotaxis where their activation restarts and amplifies the cycle of inflammation. IL-17 and additional cytokines released from the influx of neutrophils, T and dendritic cells mediate effects on localized leukocytes and keratinocytes that supports the progression of psoriasis by inciting chronic inflammation.

== Role in asthma ==
The IL-17F gene was discovered in 2001 and is located on chromosome 6p12. Notably, among this family, IL-17F has been well characterized both in vitro and in vivo and has been shown to have a pro-inflammatory role in asthma. IL-17F is clearly expressed in the airway of asthmatics and its expression level is correlated with disease severity. Moreover, a coding region variant (H161R) of the IL-17F gene is inversely associated with asthma and encodes an antagonist for the wild-type IL-17F. IL-17F is able to induce several cytokines, chemokines and adhesion molecules in bronchial epithelial cells, vein endothelial cells, fibroblasts and eosinophils. IL-17F utilizes IL-17RA and IL-17RC as its receptors and activates the MAP kinase-related pathway. IL-17F is derived from several cell types such as Th17 cells, mast cells and basophils, and shows a wide tissue expression pattern including lung. Overexpression of IL-17F gene in the airway of mice is associated with airway neutrophilia, the induction of many cytokines, an increase in airway hyperreactivity, and mucus hypersecretion. Hence, IL-17F may have a crucial role in allergic airway inflammation and have important therapeutic implications in asthma.

== Therapeutic target ==
Because of its involvement in immune regulatory functions, IL-17 inhibitors are being investigated as possible treatments for autoimmune diseases such as rheumatoid arthritis, psoriasis and inflammatory bowel disease. In January 2015, the FDA approved the use of secukinumab (trade name Cosentyx), an IL-17 inhibiting monoclonal antibody, for the treatment of moderate to severe plaque psoriasis. In addition, Cosentyx has been approved in Japan for use in treating psoriatic arthritis. The anti-IL-23 antibody ustekinumab can also be used to effectively treat psoriasis by indirectly reducing IL-17.

Based on emerging evidence from animal models, IL-17 has been suggested as a target for anti-inflammatory therapies to improve recovery post-stroke and to reduce the formation of skin cancer. IL-17 has also been implicated in multiple sclerosis.

The active form of vitamin D has been found to 'severely impair' production of the IL-17 and IL-17F cytokines by Th17 cells.

== Receptors ==
The IL-17 receptor family consists of five, broadly distributed receptors (IL-17RA, B, C, D and E) that present with individual ligand specificities. Within this family of receptors, IL-17RA is the best-described. IL-17RA binds both IL-17A and IL-17F and is expressed in multiple tissues: vascular endothelial cells, peripheral T cells, B cell lineages, fibroblast, lung, myelomonocytic cells, and marrow stromal cells. Signal transduction for both IL-17A and IL-17F requires the presence of a heterodimeric complex consisting of both IL-17RA and IL-17RC and the absence of either receptor results in ineffective signal transduction. This pattern is reciprocated for other members of the IL-17 family such as IL-17E, which requires an IL-17RA-IL-17RB complex (also known as IL-17Rh1, IL-17BR or IL-25R) for effective function.

Another member of this receptor family, IL-17RB, binds both IL-17B and IL-17E. Furthermore, it is expressed in the kidney, pancreas, liver, brain, and intestine. IL-17RC is expressed by the prostate, cartilage, kidney, liver, heart, and muscle, and its gene may undergo alternate splicing to produce a soluble receptor in addition to its cell membrane-bound form. In a similar manner, the gene for IL-17RD may undergo alternative splicing to yield a soluble receptor. This feature may allow these receptors to inhibit the stimulatory effects of their yet-undefined ligands. The least-described of these receptors, IL-17RE, is known to be expressed in the pancreas, brain, and prostate.

Signal transduction by these receptors is as diverse as their distribution. These receptors do not exhibit a significant similarity in extracellular or intracellular amino acid sequence when compared to other cytokine receptors. Transcription factors such as TRAF6, JNK, Erk1/2, p38, AP-1 and NF-κB have been implicated in IL-17 mediated signaling in a stimulation-dependent, tissue-specific manner. Other signaling mechanisms have also been proposed, but more work is needed to fully elucidate the true signaling pathways used by these diverse receptors.
