= Interleukin 25 =

Cytokine that belongs to the IL-17 cytokine family

IL25

Identifiers
- Aliases: IL25, IL17E, IL-25, interleukin 25
- External IDs: OMIM: 605658; MGI: 2155888; GeneCards: IL25

Gene location (Human)
Chr.	Chromosome 14 (human)
Band	14q11.2	Start	23,372,809 bp
Band	14q11.2	End	23,376,403 bp

Gene location (Mouse)
Chr.	Chromosome 14 (mouse)
Band	14|14 C3	Start	55,170,152 bp
Band	14|14 C3	End	55,173,294 bp
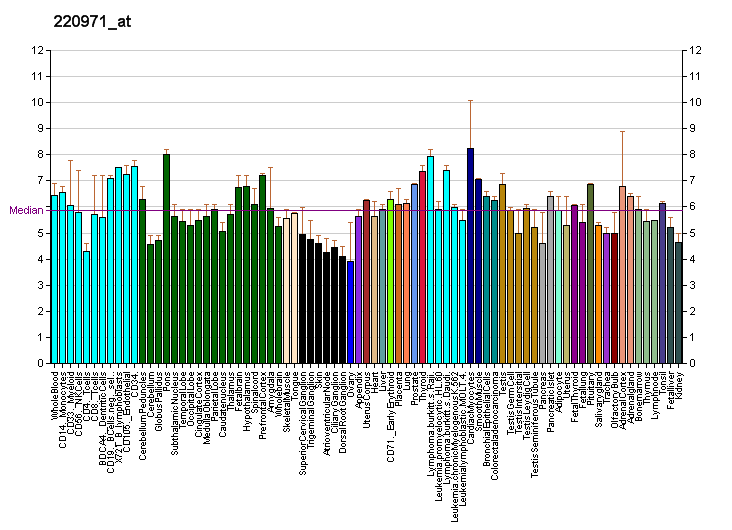
RNA expression pattern
Bgee	Human / Mouse (ortholog); Top expressed in: testicle; right auricle of heart; human musculoskeletal system; muscular system; skeletal muscle; gastrocnemius muscle; thigh; muscle of thigh; ventricle of the heart; left ventricle / Top expressed in: embryo; embryo; embryo; neural tube; placenta; olfactory bulb; diencephalon; gland; endocrine gland; superior frontal gyrus; More reference expression data
BioGPS	More reference expression data
Gene ontology
Molecular function	interleukin-17E receptor binding; cytokine activity
Cellular component	extracellular region; extracellular space
Biological process	response to fungus; interleukin-13 production; response to nematode; inflammatory response to antigenic stimulus; eosinophil differentiation; positive regulation of transcription by RNA polymerase II; interleukin-5 production; inflammatory response; regulation of signaling receptor activity; biological process; interleukin-17-mediated signaling pathway
Sources:Amigo / QuickGO
Orthologs
Databases	NCBI: entry; OMA: entry
Species	Human	Mouse
Entrez	64806	140806
Ensembl	ENSG00000166090	ENSMUSG00000040770
UniProt	Q9H293	Q8VHH8
RefSeq (mRNA)	NM_172314; NM_022789	NM_080729
RefSeq (protein)	NP_073626; NP_758525	NP_542767
Location (UCSC)	Chr 14: 23.37 – 23.38 Mb	Chr 14: 55.17 – 55.17 Mb
PubMed search
- Wikidata
View/Edit Human	View/Edit Mouse

Interleukin-25 (IL-25) – also known as interleukin-17E (IL-17E) – is a protein that in humans is encoded by the IL25 gene on chromosome 14. IL-25 was discovered in 2001 and is made up of 177 amino acids.

== IL-25 and IL-17 family ==
IL-25 is a cytokine that belongs to the IL-17 cytokine family together with IL-17A (named also IL-17), IL-17B, IL-17C, IL-17D and IL-17F. This is why IL-25 has the alternative name IL-17E. All members have homologous amino acid sequence segments and spatially conserved cysteines. It is the IL-25 that differs from other members in its function and structure.

IL-25 signals through a heterohexameric receptor complex containing IL-17RA and IL-17RB. In this complex, IL-25 forms a homodimer with IL-17RB, which then binds to IL-17RA. The IL-17RA subunit is common for IL-17A and IL-17F, and IL-17RB is common for IL-17B. Both IL-17RA and IL-17RB are essential for IL-25 functions. IL-25 does not bind directly to IL-17RA, but this subunit is necessary for its functions - as well as IL-17RB which directly bind IL-25.

== Function ==
IL-25 is produced by many cell types. These cells include T cells, dendritic cells, macrophages, mast cells, basophils, eosinophils, epithelial cells and Paneth cells.

This cytokine can induce NF-κB activation, and stimulate the production of IL-8 (named also CXCL8), which is the major chemotactic substance of neutrophils.

Another important function of interleukin 25 is to support the Th2 immune response. IL-25 has been shown to induce the production of IL-4, IL-5 and IL-13. Evidence is the expression of IL-17RB on Th2 cells, not on Th1 and Th17. In addition, IL-25 is responsible for the decrease in IFN gamma.

Because IL-25 promotes the development of a Th2 immune response, it acts to protect against several bowel infections caused by helminths. This role of IL-25 has been demonstrated in these intestinal parasites - Nippostrongylus brasiliensis , Trichuris muris , Trichinella spiralis and Heligmosomoides polygyrus bekeri.

IL-25 is also referred to as the regulator of IL-9 production. IL-25 has been shown to increase the production of IL-9 in Th9 cells. Th9 cells can arise not only from naive T cells but also from differentiated Th2 cells.

Another function of IL-25 is the activation of natural lymphoid cells 2 (ILC2). IL-25 and IL-33 are the most potent activators of ILC2.

== Clinical significance ==
IL-25 induces the production of other cytokines, including IL-4, IL-5 and IL-13 in multiple tissues, which stimulate the expansion of eosinophils. This cytokine is an important molecule controlling immunity of the gut and has been implicated in chronic inflammation associated with the gastrointestinal tract. IL-25 can kill some types of breast cancer cells.

Further, the IL-25 gene has been identified in a chromosomal region associated with diseases of the gut such as inflammatory bowel disease (IBD), although no direct evidence suggests that IL-25 plays any role in this disease.

IL-25 has potent antitumor activity in vivo in several human cancers including melanoma, breast, lung, colon, and pancreatic cancers, suggesting the potential clinical use of IL-17E as an anticancer agent.

== IL-25 and allergy ==
IL-25 works pathologically in allergies. It is a cytokine that supports the Th2 response. IL-25 induces IL-4, IL-5 a IL-13, cytokines which play important role in allergies.

Many studies suggest that blocking IL-25 activity might be useful in the treatment of allergies. Research suggests blocking of IL-25 activity by neutralizing antibodies delayed Th2 differentiation and the production of cytokines IL-4, IL-5 and IL-13, which has also been demonstrated by IL-25 knockout murine models.

IL-25 influences the development of nasal polyps, and may also be involved in the etiology of chronic rhinitis with nasal polyps. A 2018 study found that after using a non-neutralizing antibody against IL-25, levels of IL-4, IL-5, and IL-13 decreased, as well as the number of nasal polyps.

Another proposed option of treating allergies with IL-25 is a combination of neutralizing antibodies against IL-25, IL-33 and TSLP (thymic stromal lymphopoietin). All three of these cytokines support the Th2 immune response.
