= IL17RC =

Protein-coding gene in the species Homo sapiens

Identifiers
- Aliases: IL17RC, IL17-RL, IL17RL, CANDF9, interleukin 17 receptor C
- External IDs: OMIM: 610925; MGI: 2159336; GeneCards: IL17RC

Gene location (Human)
Chr.	Chromosome 3 (human)
Band	3p25.3|3p25.3-p24.1	Start	9,917,074 bp
Band	3p25.3|3p25.3-p24.1	End	9,933,630 bp

Gene location (Mouse)
Chr.	Chromosome 6 (mouse)
Band	6|6 E3	Start	113,448,388 bp
Band	6|6 E3	End	113,460,101 bp
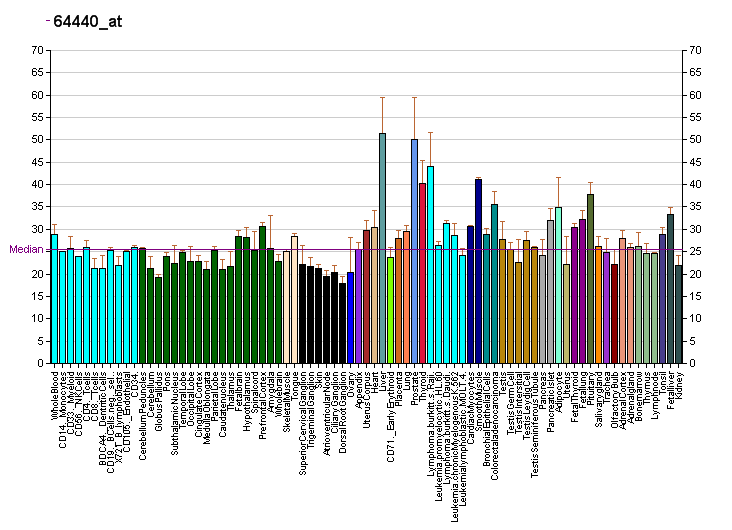

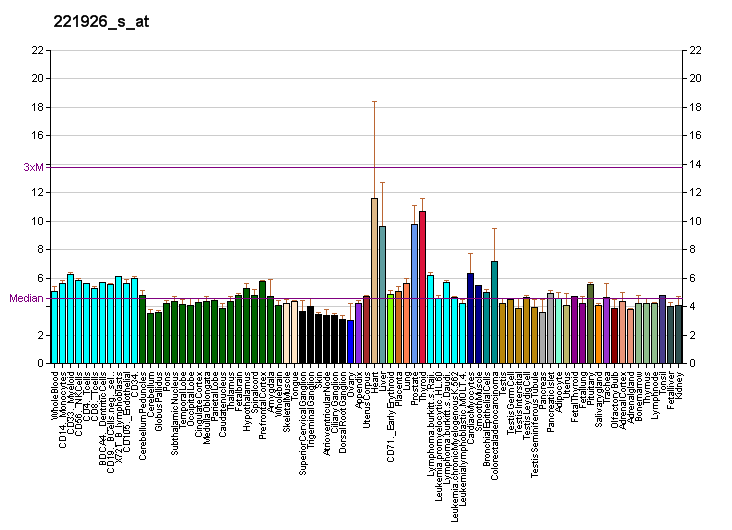
RNA expression pattern
Bgee	Human / Mouse (ortholog); Top expressed in: anterior pituitary; right adrenal cortex; right lobe of liver; gastric mucosa; left adrenal cortex; skin of abdomen; skin of leg; muscle layer of sigmoid colon; apex of heart; right lobe of thyroid gland / Top expressed in: ileum; jejunum; lip; esophagus; colon; zone of skin; urinary bladder; white adipose tissue; duodenum; humerus; More reference expression data
BioGPS	More reference expression data
Gene ontology
Molecular function	interleukin-17 receptor activity; signaling receptor binding
Cellular component	integral component of membrane; cell surface; integral component of plasma membrane; membrane; plasma membrane
Biological process	positive regulation of cytokine production involved in inflammatory response; granulocyte chemotaxis; defense response to fungus; interleukin-17-mediated signaling pathway; cytokine-mediated signaling pathway
Sources:Amigo / QuickGO
Orthologs
Databases	NCBI: entry; OMA: entry
Species	Human	Mouse
Entrez	84818	171095
Ensembl	ENSG00000163702	ENSMUSG00000030281
UniProt	Q8NAC3	Q8K4C2
RefSeq (mRNA)	NM_001203263; NM_001203264; NM_001203265; NM_032732; NM_153460 NM_153461; NM_153462; NM_153463; NM_001367278; NM_001367279; NM_001367280	NM_134159; NM_178942
RefSeq (protein)	NP_001190192; NP_001190193; NP_001190194; NP_116121; NP_703190 NP_703191; NP_001354207; NP_001354208; NP_001354209	NP_598920; NP_849273
Location (UCSC)	Chr 3: 9.92 – 9.93 Mb	Chr 6: 113.45 – 113.46 Mb
PubMed search
- Wikidata
View/Edit Human	View/Edit Mouse

Interleukin-17 receptor C is a protein that in humans is encoded by the IL17RC gene.

== Function ==
This gene encodes a single-pass transmembrane protein that shares limited similarity with the interleukin-17 receptor. Multiple alternatively spliced transcript variants encoding different isoforms have been detected for this gene, but the full-length nature of only three have been determined to date.

== See also ==
- Interleukin-17 receptor
