= T helper 17 cell =

Subset of pro-inflammatory T helper cells

Details
- System: Immune system

Identifiers
- Acronym: T_{h}17 cell
- MeSH: D058504

T helper 17 cells (T_{h}17) are a subset of pro-inflammatory T helper cells defined by their production of interleukin 17 (IL-17). They are related to T regulatory cells and the signals that cause T_{h}17s to actually inhibit T_{reg} differentiation. However, T_{h}17s are developmentally distinct from T_{h}1 and T_{h}2 lineages. T_{h}17 cells play an important role in maintaining mucosal barriers and contributing to pathogen clearance at mucosal surfaces; such protective and non-pathogenic T_{h}17 cells have been termed as T_{reg}17 cells.

They have also been implicated in autoimmune and inflammatory disorders. The loss of T_{h}17 cell populations at mucosal surfaces has been linked to chronic inflammation and microbial translocation. These regulatory T_{h}17 cells can be generated by TGF-beta plus IL-6 in vitro.

== Differentiation ==
Like conventional regulatory T cells (T_{reg}), induction of regulatory T_{reg}17 cells could play an important role in modulating and preventing certain autoimmune diseases. T_{reg}17 (Regulatory T_{h}17) cells are generated from CD4^{+} T cells.

Transforming growth factor beta (TGF-β), interleukin 6 (IL-6), interleukin 21 (IL-21) and interleukin 23 (IL-23) contribute to T_{h}17 formation in mice and humans. Key factors in the differentiation of T_{h}17 cells are signal transducer and the activator of transcription 3 (Stat3) and retinoic acid receptor-related orphan receptors gamma (RORγ) and alpha (RORα). T_{h}17 cells are differentiated when naive T cells are exposed to the cytokines mentioned above. These cytokines are produced by activated antigen presenting cells (APCs) after contact with pathogens. The T_{h}17 cells can alter their differentiation program ultimately giving rise to either protective or pro-inflammatory pathogenic cells. The protective and non-pathogenic T_{h}17 cells induced by IL-6 and TGF-β are termed as T_{reg}17 cells. The pathogenic T_{h}17 cells are induced by IL-23 and IL-1β. IL-21, produced by T_{h}17 cells themselves, has also been shown to initiate an alternative route for the activation of T_{h}17 populations. Both interferon gamma (IFNγ) and IL-4, the main stimulators of T_{h}1 and T_{h}2 differentiation, respectively, have been shown to inhibit T_{h}17 differentiation.

Similar to T_{h}17 cells the T_{reg}17 development depended on the transcription factor Stat3.

== Function ==
T_{h}17 cells play a role in adaptive immunity protecting the body against pathogens. However, anti-fungal immunity appears to be limited to particular sites with detrimental effects observed. Their main effector cytokines are IL-17A, IL-17F, IL-21, and IL-22, as well as granulocyte-macrophage colony-stimulating factor (GM-CSF). IL-17 family cytokines (IL-17A and IL-17F) target innate immune cells and epithelial cells, among others, to produce G-CSF and IL-8 (CXCL8), which leads to neutrophil production and recruitment. In this way, T_{h}17 cell lineage appears to be one of the three major subsets of effector T cells, as these cells are involved in regulation of neutrophils, while T_{h}2 cells regulate eosinophils, basophils and mast cells, and T_{h}1 cells regulate macrophages and monocytes. Thus, three T helper cell subsets are able to influence the myeloid part of the immune system, largely responsible for innate defense against pathogens.

T_{reg}17 cells with regulatory phenotype with in vivo immune-suppressive properties in the gut have also been identified as rT_{h}17 cells.

T_{reg}17 cells produce IL-17 and IL-10 and low level of IL-22 and suppress autoimmune and other immune responses. CD4^{+} T cells polarized with IL-23 and IL-6 are pathogenic upon adoptive transfer in type 1 diabetes while cells polarized with TGF-beta and IL-6 are not pathogenic., The intracellular aryl hydrocarbon receptor (AhR), which is activated by certain aromatic compounds, is specifically expressed in T_{reg}17 cells. These cells are regulated by IL-23 and TGF-beta. The production of IL-22 in this subset of T_{h}17 cells is regulated by AhR and T_{reg}17 cells are depend on activation of the transcription factor Stat3. In a steady state, TGF-beta and AhR ligands induce low expression of IL-22 along with high expression of AhR, c-MAF, IL-10, and IL-21 that might play a protective role in cell regeneration and host microbiome homeostasis.

T_{h}17 cells mediate the regression of tumors in mice, but were also found to promote tumor formation induced by colonic inflammation in mice. Like other T helper cells, T_{h}17 cells closely interact with B cells in response to pathogens. T_{h}17 cells are involved in B cell recruitment through CXCL13 chemokine signaling, and T_{h}17 activity may encourage antibody production.

T_{reg}17 cells regulate the function of T_{h}17 cells that are important role in the host defense against fungal and bacterial pathogens and participate in the pathogenesis of multiple inflammatory and autoimmune disorders. Selective deletion of Stat3 caused spontaneous severe colitis because of the lack of T_{reg}17 cells and increase in pathogenic T_{h}17 cells. The mechanism of T_{reg}17 cell action is expression of chemokine receptor CCR6, which facilitates trafficking into areas of T_{h}17 inflammation. This is also seen in human disease such glomerulonephritis (GN) in the kidney. Conversion of pathogenic T_{h}17 cells in vivo at the conclusion of an inflammatory disease process by TGF-β results in the generation of T_{reg}17 like cells. There is also conservation across species of T_{reg}17 cells.

== In disease ==
The dysregulation of T_{h}17 and switch to Th17 pathogenic phenotype cells have been associated with autoimmune disorders and inflammation. In the case of autoimmune disorders, T_{h}17 cell over activation can cause an inappropriate amount of inflammation, like in the case of rheumatoid arthritis. T_{h}17 cells have also been shown to be necessary for maintenance of mucosal immunity. In HIV, the loss of T_{h}17 cell populations can contribute to chronic infection.

=== Role in autoimmune disorders ===
T_{h}17 cells, particularly auto-specific T_{h}17 cells, are associated with autoimmune disease such as multiple sclerosis, rheumatoid arthritis, and psoriasis. T_{h}17 overactivation against autoantigen will cause type 3 immune complex and complement-mediated hypersensitivity. Rheumatoid arthritis or Arthus reaction belong to this category. Apart from autoantigen reactivity, T_{h}17 cells' inherent biology of low end MAP kinases signalling, especially Erk1/2 and p38, help their survival by refusing activation induced cell death (AICD). Together, excessive activity against autoantigen and prolonged existence of T_{h}17 cells have deleterious consequence in autoimmune disease like Rheumatoid arthritis.

Bone erosion caused by mature osteoclast cells is common in patients with rheumatoid arthritis. Activated T helper cells such as T_{h}1, T_{h}2, and T_{h}17 are found in the synovial cavity during the time of inflammation due to rheumatoid arthritis. The known mechanisms associated with the differentiation of osteoclast precursors into mature osteoclasts involve the signaling molecules produced by immune-associated cells, as well as the direct cell to cell contact of osteoblasts and osteoclast precursors. However, it has been suggested that T_{h}17 can also play a more major role in osteoclast differentiation via cell to cell contact with osteoclast precursors.

T_{h}17 cells may contribute to the development of late phase asthmatic response due to its increases in gene expression relative to T_{reg} cells.

=== Contribution of T_{h}17 cells in HIV pathogenesis ===
The depletion of T_{h}17 cell populations in the intestine disrupts the intestinal barrier, increases levels of movement of bacteria out of the gut through microbial translocation, and contributes to chronic HIV infection and progression to AIDS. Microbial translocation results in bacteria moving from out of the gut lumen, into the lamina propria, to the lymph nodes, and beyond into non-lymphatic tissues. It can cause the constant immune activation seen through the body in the late stages of HIV. Increasing Th17 cell populations in the intestine has been shown to be both an effective treatment as well as possibly preventative.

Although all CD4+ T cells gut are severely depleted by HIV, the loss of intestinal T_{h}17 cells in particular has been linked to symptoms of chronic, pathogenic HIV and SIV infection. Microbial translocation is a major factor that contributes to chronic inflammation and immune activation in the context of HIV. In non-pathogenic cases of SIV, microbial translocation is not observed. Th17 cells prevent severe HIV infection by maintaining the intestinal epithelial barrier during HIV infection in the gut. Because of their high levels of CCR5 expression, the coreceptor for HIV, they are preferentially infected and depleted. Thus, it is through Th17 cell depletion that microbial translocation occurs.

Additionally, the loss of T_{h}17 cells in the intestine leads to a loss of balance between inflammatory T_{h}17 cells and T_{reg} cells, their anti-inflammatory counterparts. Because of their immunosuppressive properties, they are thought to decrease the anti-viral response to HIV, contributing to pathogenesis. There is more T_{reg} activity compared to T_{h}17 activity, and the immune response to the virus is less aggressive and effective.

Revitalizing T_{h}17 cells has been shown to decrease symptoms of chronic infection, including decreased inflammation, and results in improved responses to highly active anti-retroviral treatment (HAART). This is an important finding—microbial translocation general results in unresponsiveness to HAART. Patients continue to exhibit symptoms and do not show as reduced a viral load as expected. In an SIV-rhesus monkey model, it was found that administering IL-21, a cytokine shown to encourage Th17 differentiation and proliferation, decreases microbial translocation by increasing Th17 cell populations. It is hopeful that more immunotherapies targeting Th17 cells could help patients who do not respond well to HAART.

In addition, T_{h}17 cells are cellular reservoirs of virus in patients submitted to antiretroviral therapy (in addition to the major cell sanctuary which are follicular Th cells) and should contribute to the latency of the HIV infection.

=== Contribution of T_{h}17 cells in tuberculosis ===
Recent studies have recognized that T_{h}17 T cells may play a role in tuberculosis. Polyfunctional T cells with T_{h}17 T cell features are depleted in individuals that progress to active TB after infection. In freshly resected lung tissue, from individuals with active or previous TB, CD4^{+} T cells have been identified that are enriched for IL-17–producing cells, including antigen specific T cells. A cohort study conducted in Peru demonstrated that individuals who progressed to develop active TB after infection were depleted in T_{h}17 functioning T cells.

=== Role of vitamin D ===
The active form of vitamin D (1,25-Dihydroxyvitamin D3) has been found to 'severely impair' production of the IL-17 and IL-17F cytokines by T_{h}17 cells. Thus, active form of vitamin D is a direct inhibitor for T_{h}17 differentiation. In this way, oral administration of vitamin D3 was proposed to be a promising tool for the treatment of Th17-mediated diseases. In young patients with asthma 1,25-Dihydroxyvitamin D3-treated dendritic cells significantly reduced the percentage of T_{h}17 cells, as well as IL-17 production.

== History of research ==
Intensive research starting in 2004 in mouse models elucidated its transcription factors and the cytokines that provoke differentiation.
