= IL17RA =

Protein-coding gene in the species Homo sapiens

Identifiers
- Aliases: IL17RA, CANDF5, CD217, CDw217, IL-17RA, IL17R, hIL-17R, interleukin 17 receptor A, IMD51
- External IDs: OMIM: 605461; MGI: 107399; GeneCards: IL17RA
Available structures
PDB	Ortholog search: PDBe RCSB
PDB	List of PDB id codes 3JVF, 4HSA, 4NUX

Gene location (Human)
Chr.	Chromosome 22 (human)
Band	22q11.1	Start	17,084,954 bp
Band	22q11.1	End	17,115,693 bp

Gene location (Mouse)
Chr.	Chromosome 6 (mouse)
Band	6 F1|6 56.95 cM	Start	120,440,208 bp
Band	6 F1|6 56.95 cM	End	120,464,520 bp
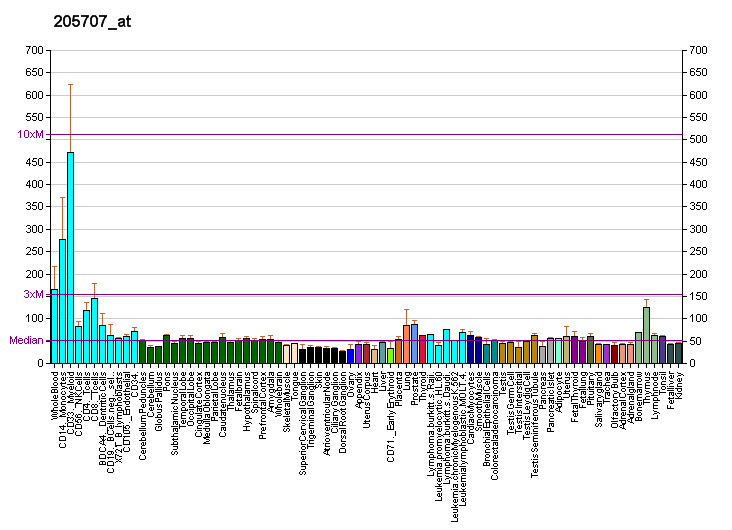
RNA expression pattern
Bgee	Human / Mouse (ortholog); Top expressed in: blood; monocyte; trabecular bone; granulocyte; bone marrow; bone marrow cell; tendon of biceps brachii; internal globus pallidus; mucosa of ileum; secondary oocyte / Top expressed in: granulocyte; blood; stroma of bone marrow; thymus; mesenteric lymph nodes; aortic valve; ascending aorta; spleen; tibiofemoral joint; saccule; More reference expression data
BioGPS	More reference expression data
Gene ontology
Molecular function	interleukin-17 receptor activity; signaling receptor binding; protein binding
Cellular component	integral component of membrane; extracellular region; integral component of plasma membrane; membrane; plasma membrane
Biological process	positive regulation of cytokine production involved in inflammatory response; cell surface receptor signaling pathway; fibroblast activation; positive regulation of inflammatory response; granulocyte chemotaxis; positive regulation of interleukin-23 production; defense response to fungus; cellular response to cytokine stimulus; interleukin-17-mediated signaling pathway
Sources:Amigo / QuickGO
Orthologs
Databases	NCBI: entry; OMA: entry
Species	Human	Mouse
Entrez	23765	16172
Ensembl	ENSG00000177663	ENSMUSG00000002897
UniProt	Q96F46	Q60943
RefSeq (mRNA)	NM_014339; NM_001289905	NM_008359
RefSeq (protein)	NP_001276834; NP_055154	NP_032385
Location (UCSC)	Chr 22: 17.08 – 17.12 Mb	Chr 6: 120.44 – 120.46 Mb
PubMed search
- Wikidata
View/Edit Human	View/Edit Mouse

Interleukin 17 receptor A, also known as IL17RA and CDw217 (cluster of differentiation w217), is a human gene.

Interleukin 17A (IL17A)is a proinflammatory cytokine secreted by activated T-lymphocytes. It is a potent inducer of the maturation of CD34-positive hematopoietic precursors into neutrophils. The protein encoded by this gene (interleukin 17A receptor; IL17RA) is a ubiquitous type I membrane glycoprotein that binds with low affinity to interleukin 17A. Interleukin 17A and its receptor play a pathogenic role in many inflammatory and autoimmune diseases such as rheumatoid arthritis. Like other cytokine receptors, this receptor likely has a multimeric structure.

== See also ==
- Interleukin-17 receptor
