= Primary cutaneous diffuse large B-cell lymphoma, leg type =

- Other names: PCDLBCL-LT; PCDLBCL, leg type; primary cutaneous DLBCL, leg type
- Specialty: Dermatology, hematology, oncology
- Symptoms: One or more red/violaceous skin nodules/tumors on the legs and/or uncommonly elsewhere
- Complications: Spread to other tissues
- Diagnostic method: Skin biopsy
- Prognosis: guarded

Primary cutaneous diffuse large B-cell lymphoma, leg type (PCDLBCL-LT) (also termed PCDLBCL, leg type or primary cutaneous DLBCL, leg type) is a cutaneous lymphoma skin disease that occurs mostly in elderly females. In this disease, B cells (a type of lymphocyte) become malignant, accumulate in the dermis (i.e. the layer under the epidermis) and subcutaneous tissue below the dermis to form red and violaceous skin nodules and tumors. These lesions typically occur on the lower extremities but in uncommon cases may develop on the skin at virtually any other site. In ~10% of cases, the disease presents with one or more skin lesions none of which are on the lower extremities; the disease in these cases is sometimes regarded as a variant of PCDLBL, LT termed primary cutaneous diffuse large B-cell lymphoma, other (PCDLBC-O). PCDLBCL, LT is a subtype of the diffuse large B-cell lymphomas (DLBCL) and has been thought of as a cutaneous counterpart to them. Like most variants and subtypes of the DLBCL, PCDLBCL, LT is an aggressive malignancy. It has a 5-year overall survival rate of 40–55%, although the PCDLBCL-O variant has a better prognosis than cases in which the legs are involved.

Most lymphomas begin in a lymph node, mucosa-associated lymphoid tissue, the spleen, or another lymphoid tissue within the lymphatic system and then may spread to the skin. In these cases the skin is a secondarily site of involvement. PCDLBC, LT is a primary cutaneous lymphoma, i.e. it begins in the skin and then may spread to lymphoid and/or non-lymphoid tissues in virtually any other site. A suspect PCDLBCL, LT that is not limited to the skin at the time of diagnosis should be regarded as some other variant or subtype of the diffuse large B-cell lymphomas.

PCDLBC, LT represents 5–10% of all primary cutaneous lymphomas. It is to be distinguished from two other primary cutaneous lymphomas that involve B-cells, primary cutaneous follicle center lymphoma (PCFCL) and primary cutaneous marginal zone lymphoma (PCMZL), as well as from a B-cell lymphoma that at diagnosis may appear to be limited to the skin but often is a systemic disease affecting numerous organs and tissues viz., intravascular large B-cell lymphoma (IVLBCL). These three B-cell lymphomas differ from PCDLBCL, LT in numerous ways but most importantly in their aggressiveness. IVLEBC is, like PCDLBCL, LT, an aggressive disease with a guarded prognosis, but unlike the former disease, is often widely disseminated at presentation. PCFCL and PCMZL, in contrast, are indolent lymphomas with a relatively good prognosis. Distinguishing between these four cutaneous B-cell lymphomas at the time of diagnosis is critical for their appropriate treatment.

== Presentation ==
Afflicted individuals (median age 76 years; range 49–92 years; more common in females) typically present with one or more rapidly growing red to bluish-red, firm tumors located on the leg(s) at some site(s) below the knees. Occasionally the lesions are ulcerated. About 10% of cases do not have lesions on the legs but rather present with one or more skin lesions outside of the legs; ~20% of individuals present with cutaneous lesion(s) but on further or later investigation are found to have disease in non-cutaneous sites such as the lymph nodes, visceral organs, bone marrow, and/or, rarely, central nervous system. Some individuals, particularly those with widespread disease, complain of having the B symptoms of fever, night sweats, and/or weight loss. DLBCL cases that have cutaneous lesions in association with widespread disease may be advanced PCDLBCL, LT but without evidence that the disease began in the skin are diagnosed as having and treated for some other variant or subtype of the diffuse large B-cell lymphomas that has spread to the skin.

== Pathophysiology ==
The neoplastic cells in DLBCL are derived primarily from either germinal center B cells (i.e. GBC) or activated B cells (i.e. ABC) with ABC-based DLBCL usually being a more aggressive disease than GBC-based DLBCL. The neoplastic cells in PCDLBCL, LT are ABC, bear gene abnormalities similar to those found in ABC-based DLBCL, and as a likely result of this produce an aggressive disease. The potentially pathogenic gene abnormalities in the neoplastic cells of PCDLBCL, LT include:

- Overexpression of the MYC gene caused by its mutation and/or translocation occurs in ~50% of cases. This protooncogene's product, Myc, encodes a transcription factor which regulates the expression of genes whose products stimulate cell proliferation and metastasis (i.e. spread to other tissues).
- Overexpression of the BCL2 gene (33% of cases) whose product, BcL2, inhibits apoptosis (i.e. programmed cell death) to thereby increase cell survival. "Double expresser lymphomas", i.e. those lymphomas with neoplastic cells that overexpress both Myc and Bcl2, are associated with a poor prognosis in PCDLBCL, LT.
- Loss of function mutations in the TNFAIP3 gene (40% of cases) whose product, tumor necrosis factor, alpha-induced protein 3, acts indirectly to inhibit TNF-mediated apoptosis and to activate the NF-kappa B signaling pathway. Both effects block apoptosis and thereby prolong cell survival.
- Mutations in the CD79B and CARD11 genes (rare cases) also lead to activation of the NF-kappa B signaling pathway.
- Overexpression of PD-L1 and PD-L2 genes (frequent cases) due to their translocation (both genes are located on the long arm of chromosome 9 at position 24.1) or to overactivation of the JAK-STAT signaling pathway caused by mutations in the MYC gene, overexpression of MIr35A microRNA, or increased expression of cytokines (e.g. IL-10 or Interferon gamma) in the tumor environment. The products of these two genes, programmed death-ligand 1 and programmed cell death 1 ligand 2, respectively, inhibit the anti-tumor responses of cells in the immune system and thereby help the neoplastic cells to avoid immune surveillance.
- Mutations in the PIM1 gene occur occasionally. The product of this protooncogene, proto-oncogene serine/threonine-protein kinase Pim-1, is indirectly involved in, and can promote, the proliferation and survival of cells.
- Hypermethylated of the promoters for two tumor suppressor genes, CDKN2B and CDKN2A (11 and 44% of cases, respectively) stops the genes from expressing their products, cyclin-dependent kinase 4 inhibitor B and cyclin-dependent kinase inhibitor 2A, respectively. Both products act indirectly to limit the proliferation and survival of the neoplastic cells in PCDLBCL, LT Silencing the CDKN2A gene is associated with a poor prognosis in PCDLBCL, LT and appears to be involved in the development of various types of cancer.
- Various chromosome imbalances (i.e. abnormal numbers of chromosomes or parts of chromosomes) such as increases in chromosome 3, the long arm of chromosome 2 or 11, or the short arm of chromosome 7 and decreases in chromosomes 13, 14, or 19 or the short arm of chromosome 17 or the long arm of chromosome 6 occur in PCDLBCL, LT and are likely to cause gene abnormalities that help promote this disease's malignancy.

These findings suggest that the development and/or progression of PCDLBCL, LT involves the step-wise acquisition by B-cells and/or their ABC descendants of gene abnormalities which promote the activation of NF-kappa B, B-cell receptor, JAK/STAT, and perhaps other signaling pathways. In consequence, these cells progressively acquire increased rates of proliferation, prolonged survival, the ability to spread to other tissues, the ability to avoid attack by the immune system, and other malignant behaviors that characterize this disease.

== Diagnosis ==
The diagnosis of PCDLBCL, LT depends on analyzing skin biopsies of the involved sites microscopically. These sites show dense, diffuse sheets of infiltrating large-sized B-cells that resemble centroblasts and immunoblasts. The infiltrates are located in the dermis and subcutaneous tissue but, unless there is ulceration, they are separated from the epidermis by the "grenz zone" i.e. a narrow area of the papillary dermis (i.e. the uppermost layer of the dermis that separates the dermis from the epidermis) that is not infiltrated by the disease. In addition to the neoplastic B-cells, these infiltrates contain two types of cells that suppress immune reactions viz., M2 macrophages that express CD163 and myeloid-derived suppressor cells that express PD-L1 and CD33. The sites may also contain poorly differentiated cells; but rarely have T-cells, eosinophils, or plasma cells. The lesion's neoplastic B-cells usually have a high proliferative index. Immunostaining these tissues indicates that the neoplastic cells express B-cell marker proteins such as FOXP1 (90% of cases), (Bcl-2, (90% of cases), IRF4 (85% of cases), Bcl-6 (~60% of cases), CD20, CD79a, PAX5, and cytoplasmic IgM. The cells usually do not express CD5, CD10, CD30, or CD138. The neoplastic cells are also usually characterized as being of the ABC phenotype as described in the section on the variants of DLBCL, NOS and express the gene abnormalities indicated in the above Pathophysiology section. Patients should be evaluated for the involvement of non-cutaneous sites by CT scans of the chest, abdomen, and pelvis, a PET scan, and a bone marrow biopsy. Individuals who present with an extra-cutaneous DLBCL-like disease should be diagnosed as having a variant or subtype of DLBCL other than PCDLBCL, LT unless in can be established that the disease began in the skin.

=== Differential diagnosis ===
Primary cutaneous follicular center lymphoma differs from PCDLBCL, LT in that its neoplastic B cells are germinal center B cells rather than activated B cells (see Pathophysiology section) that often infiltrate tissues in a follicular (i.e. small spherical groups of cells) rather than diffuse pattern. Primary cutaneous mantle cell lymphoma differs from PCDLBCL, LT in that is neoplastic B cells appear more like monocytes and/or plasma cells rather than centroblasts or immunoblasts. Intravascular large B-cell lymphoma differs from PCDLBCL, LT in that involved tissues contain large, neoplastic B-cells that are strictly confined within the lumen of small- to medium-sized dermal and subcutaneous blood vessels.

== Treatment ==
Previously, most patients with PCDLBCL, LT were treated with the CHOP chemotherapy regimen of cycloheximide, hydroxydaunorubicin, oncovin, and prednisone. The more recent addition of the immunotherapy drug, rituximab, to this regimen has given better results. Rituximab is a monoclonal antibody that kills cells which express high levels of CD20 by binding to this cell-surface protein and thereby targeting them for attack by the hosts immune system. Accordingly, the addition of rituximab to CHOP, i.e. the R-CHOP chemoimmunotherapy regimen. with or without radiotherapy (used to treat symptoms resulting from specific localized lesions) is now recommended by the European Organisation for Research and Treatment of Cancer and the International Society for Cutaneous Lymphomas as first line therapy for single, localized, and widespread diseases. Cases in which hydroxydaunorubicin is contraindicated because of, e.g. preexisting heart disease, may treated with the R-COP regimen (i.e. R-CHOP minus hydroxydaunorubicin). Patients who might be intolerant to R-CHO because of general health issues have been treated with just rituximab and radiotherapy although more recent reports indicate that these patients may be successfully treated with a regimen that replaces hydroxydaunorubicin with PEGylated, liposome-encased doxorubicin in the R-CHOP regimen.

=== Experimental treatments ===
A phase II clinical trial is recruiting individuals to study the efficacy and safety of nivolumab, a (monoclonal antibody that binds to programmed death-ligand 1 thereby blocking its ability to suppress immune responses) with or without varlilumab (a monoclonal antibody that binds to the CD27 protein expressed by cells and thereby promotes the anti-tumor activity of T cells) in treating patients with aggressive B-cell lymphomas, including PCDLBCL, LT that have relapsed after or do not respond to treatment. Other agents are being evaluated in refractory or relapsed B-cell lymphoid malignancies but not PCDLBCL, NOS and ultimately may prove useful in PCDLBCL, LT. These include: ofatumumab, a monoclonal antibody that is stronger than rituximab in binding to CD20; two radioimmunotherapy monoclonal antibodies, Ibritumomab tiuxetan and Tositumomab that bind CD20 to deliver radiation from their attached radioactive isotopes to and kill CD20-bearing cells; lumiliximab, a monoclonal antibody that binds to CD23; dacetuzumab, a monoclonal antibody that binds CD40; Siglec-3 a monoclonal antibody that binds CD33; blinatumomab, a monoclonal antibody that binds both CD3 and CD19; chimeric antigen receptor T cell therapy using CD19-directed CAR-T cells; and lenalidomide, a drug with multiple anti-tumor actions.
