= 225Ac-PSMA-R2 =

Investigational radiopharmaceutical

Clinical data
- Routes of administration: Intravenous
- Drug class: Radiopharmaceutical
- ATC code: V10

225Ac-PSMA-R2 is an investigational radiopharmaceutical developed by Novartis for the treatment of metastatic hormone-sensitive prostate cancer (mHSPC) and metastatic castration-resistant prostate cancer (mCRPC). It is a targeted alpha therapy (TAT) combining actinium-225 (^{225}Ac), an alpha-emitting radionuclide, with PSMA-R2, a small-molecule ligand targeting prostate-specific membrane antigen (PSMA), a protein overexpressed in prostate cancer cells. The therapy delivers high-energy alpha radiation to induce DNA damage in cancer cells, leveraging the short tissue range of alpha particles to minimize damage to healthy tissues. As of May 2025, 225Ac-PSMA-R2 is in Phase I/II clinical trials and has not received regulatory approval.

== Mechanism of action ==
225Ac-PSMA-R2 targets PSMA, a transmembrane protein highly expressed on prostate cancer cells, particularly in advanced mCRPC. The PSMA-R2 ligand binds PSMA with high affinity, delivering ^{225}Ac to tumor sites. Actinium-225, with a 9.92-day half-life, emits four alpha particles in its decay chain, causing complex DNA double-strand breaks that lead to cancer cell death. The alpha particles' short penetration range (47–85 μm) enhances tumor selectivity compared to beta-emitting therapies like lutetium-177 (177Lu)-PSMA-617. A chelator in the PSMA-R2 molecule ensures stable ^{225}Ac binding, optimizing tumor targeting and reducing off-target radiation.

== Clinical development ==
The SatisfACtion trial (NCT04597411), a Phase I/II, open-label, multi-center study by Novartis, is evaluating 225Ac-PSMA-R2 in patients with mHSPC and mCRPC. The trial includes dose escalation and expansion phases to determine the maximum tolerated dose (MTD) or recommended dose for expansion (RDE). Patients must have PSMA-positive disease, confirmed by 68Ga-PSMA-11 PET/CT, and documented disease progression. The study includes cohorts with prior 177Lu-PSMA radioligand therapy, assessing safety, tolerability, and preliminary anti-tumor activity. As of March 2025, the trial is recruiting, with no published efficacy data.

Combination approaches, such as with androgen receptor inhibitors (e.g., darolutamide), are being explored to enhance outcomes. Challenges include the limited global supply of ^{225}Ac, produced via thorium-229 decay or cyclotron methods, and the need for advanced imaging to monitor treatment response. Further trials are essential to establish 225Ac-PSMA-R2's clinical role and address supply constraints.

== Safety and tolerability ==
The safety profile of 225Ac-PSMA-R2 is under investigation, with preclinical and related ^{225}Ac-PSMA therapies (e.g., 225Ac-PSMA-617) suggesting potential toxicities. Xerostomia (severe dry mouth) is a notable risk due to salivary gland uptake, often dose-limiting in ^{225}Ac-based PSMA therapies. Other adverse effects may include myelosuppression (e.g., anemia, leukopenia, thrombocytopenia) and renal toxicity, though these are less common. The PSMA-R2 ligand incorporates improved linker technology to enhance tumor uptake and reduce off-target effects compared to earlier PSMA ligands like PSMA-617. The SatisfACtion trial is optimizing dosing to balance efficacy and toxicity.
