= 225Ac-PSMA-617 =

Investigational radiopharmaceutical

Clinical data
- Other names: Actinium (225Ac) PSMA-617, UH4J18XEL3, Actinium vipivotide tetraxetan
- Routes of administration: Intravenous
- Drug class: Radiopharmaceutical
- ATC code: V10

Identifiers
- IUPAC name: actinium-225;2-[4-[2-[[4-[[(2S)-1-[[(5S)-5-carboxy-5-[[(1S)-1,3-dicarboxypropyl]carbamoylamino]pentyl]amino]-3-naphthalen-2-yl-1-oxopropan-2-yl]carbamoyl]cyclohexyl]methylamino]-2-oxoethyl]-7,10-bis(carboxylatomethyl)-1,4,7,10-tetrazacyclododec-1-yl]acetate
- CAS Number: 2247839-16-1
- PubChem CID: 154731605
- UNII: UH4J18XEL3

Chemical and physical data
- Formula: C49H68AcN9O16
- 3D model (JSmol): Interactive image
- SMILES: C1CC(CCC1CNC(=O)CN2CCN(CCN(CCN(CC2)CC(=O)[O-])CC(=O)[O-])CC(=O)[O-])C(=O)N[C@@H](CC4=CC3=CC=CC=C3C=C4)C(=O)NCCCC[C@@H](C(=O)O)NC(=O)N[C@@H](CCC(=O)O)C(=O)O.[225Ac+3]
- InChI: InChI=1S/C49H71N9O16.Ac/c59-40(28-55-17-19-56(29-42(62)63)21-23-58(31-44(66)67)24-22-57(20-18-55)30-43(64)65)51-27-32-8-12-35(13-9-32)45(68)52-39(26-33-10-11-34-5-1-2-6-36(34)25-33)46(69)50-16-4-3-7-37(47(70)71)53-49(74)54-38(48(72)73)14-15-41(60)61;/h1-2,5-6,10-11,25,32,35,37-39H,3-4,7-9,12-24,26-31H2,(H,50,69)(H,51,59)(H,52,68)(H,60,61)(H,62,63)(H,64,65)(H,66,67)(H,70,71)(H,72,73)(H2,53,54,74);/p-3/t32?,35?,37-,38-,39-;/m0./s1/i;1-2; Key:PNFYWACVZSJSKR-DCZFPAOOSA-K

225Ac-PSMA-617 is an investigational radiopharmaceutical used in targeted alpha therapy (TAT) for metastatic castration-resistant prostate cancer (mCRPC) and, more recently, for metastatic hormone-sensitive prostate cancer (mHSPC). Initially developed by the German Cancer Research Center and University Hospital Heidelberg, it combines actinium-225 (225Ac), an alpha-emitting radionuclide, with PSMA-617, a small-molecule ligand that targets prostate-specific membrane antigen (PSMA), a protein overexpressed in prostate cancer cells. The therapy delivers high-energy alpha radiation to induce DNA damage in cancer cells while leveraging the short tissue penetration of alpha particles to minimize damage to healthy tissues. As of May 2025, 225Ac-PSMA-617 remains in early-phase clinical trials and has not yet received regulatory approval.

== Background ==
Prostate cancer is a leading cause of cancer-related mortality in men, with mCRPC representing an advanced, incurable stage resistant to androgen deprivation therapy (ADT). PSMA, a transmembrane protein, is highly expressed in prostate cancer cells, making it an ideal target for radioligand therapy. While lutetium-177 (177Lu)-PSMA-617 (approved as Pluvicto) has shown efficacy in mCRPC, some patients are resistant or develop diffuse bone marrow infiltration, limiting beta-emitter use due to hematologic toxicity. 225Ac-PSMA-617, an alpha-emitter, emerged to address these challenges, offering higher energy and shorter tissue penetration for precise tumor targeting. Initial clinical use began in 2014 as a salvage therapy under compassionate use protocols.

== Side effects ==
The primary dose-limiting toxicity of 225Ac-PSMA-617 is xerostomia (severe dry mouth) due to salivary gland uptake, affecting up to 25% of patients and leading to treatment discontinuation in some cases. Hematologic toxicities, including anemia, leukopenia, and thrombocytopenia, occur in up to one-third of patients, particularly those with extensive bone metastases. Renal toxicity is less common but reported in patients with pre-existing kidney issues. De-escalated dosing (e.g., 4–8 MBq) and tandem regimens with 177Lu-PSMA-617 have reduced salivary gland toxicity. Ongoing trials aim to optimize dosing to minimize adverse effects while maintaining efficacy.

== Mechanism of action ==
225Ac-PSMA-617 targets PSMA on prostate cancer cells via the PSMA-617 ligand, which binds with high affinity and induces rapid cellular internalization. Actinium-225, with a 9.92-day half-life, emits four alpha particles in its decay chain, delivering high linear energy transfer (LET) radiation (100 keV/μm) that causes complex DNA double-strand breaks, leading to cancer cell death. The alpha particles' short range (47–85 μm) minimizes damage to surrounding tissues compared to beta-emitters like 177Lu. The DOTA chelator in PSMA-617 ensures stable 225Ac binding, enhancing tumor retention and reducing off-target effects.

== History ==
=== Clinical development ===
Clinical evaluation of 225Ac-PSMA-617 began with retrospective studies and compassionate use in mCRPC patients resistant to standard therapies. The AcTION trial (NCT04597411), a Phase I, open-label, dose-escalation study by Novartis, is assessing safety and tolerability in men with PSMA-positive mCRPC or mHSPC, with or without prior 177Lu-PSMA-617 exposure. Patients receive up to six cycles of 225Ac-PSMA-617 (100 kBq/kg) every 8 weeks, with 68Ga-PSMA-11 PET/CT confirming PSMA expression. Other trials, such as a Phase I study in China (2020–2021) and a Dutch trial with 225Ac-PSMA-I&T (NCT05902247), are exploring dosing and efficacy. As of May 2025, trials are ongoing, with no regulatory approvals.

== Research ==
=== Efficacy ===
Early clinical data suggest 225Ac-PSMA-617 has significant anti-tumor activity. A 2016 study reported complete responses in two mCRPC patients, with prostate-specific antigen (PSA) levels dropping below detectable limits. A 2020 prospective study of 28 mCRPC patients (54% post-177Lu-PSMA-617) showed a >50% PSA decline in 53.8–66.6% of patients, with median overall survival (OS) of 10–17 months. A South African pilot study in 17 chemotherapy-naïve patients reported a ≥90% PSA decline in 82%, with 41% in remission at 12 months. A 2022 meta-analysis found >80% of patients had some PSA decline, with 60% achieving >50% reduction. Tandem therapy with 177Lu-PSMA-617 has shown promise in enhancing efficacy while reducing toxicity.

=== Challenges ===
The clinical adoption of 225Ac-PSMA-617 faces several hurdles. The global supply of 225Ac, primarily produced via thorium-229 decay or cyclotron methods, is limited, with annual production (e.g., 68 GBq from Karlsruhe, Oak Ridge, and Obninsk) supporting only thousands of doses. Small sample sizes, retrospective designs, and heterogeneity in prior treatments limit current trial data, necessitating larger, randomized controlled trials. Salivary gland toxicity remains a significant barrier, with ongoing research into protective strategies like sialendoscopy.
