= Darrick Carter =

American researcher

- Education: Oregon State University; Oregon Health Sciences University
- Occupations: Biochemist/biophysicist, and academic
- Known for: Therapeutic discovery and development Vaccine discovery and development Cancer immune therapies
- Scientific career
- Fields: Biochemistry, Biophysics
- Workplaces: PAI Life Sciences; University of Washington; Compliment Corporation; HDT Bio Corporation; Protein Advances Incorporated; Onco Incorporated; Dharma Therapeutics; Infectious Disease Research Institute

Darrick Carter is an American biochemist, biophysicist, inventor and entrepreneur. He is known for developing various therapeutics and vaccines, such as saRNA COVID-19 vaccine, influenza vaccine, and tuberculosis vaccine. Currently, he is the CEO of Compliment Corporation, and PAI Life Sciences Incorporated, as well as Founder of HDT Bio Corporation. He also holds two affiliate Professorships at the University of Washington in the Schools of Medicine and in Global Health.

Carter has published over 100 papers, and is the inventor over 180 patents and applications. He focuses his research work on the molecule drug and biologics production, development and commercial deployment. He is the scientific advisor for several vaccine and global health institutes, and serves on the board of DendriBio.

== Education ==
Carter graduated in 1993 with a bachelor's degree in biochemistry/biophysics from Oregon State University. He then enrolled at Oregon Health Sciences University, and earned his doctoral degree in biochemistry and molecular biology in 1997.

== Career ==
At the beginning of his career, Carter worked at Corixa Corporation. In early 2000s Carter founded Proteinchemist.com, an online resource for protein chemists and others doing protein chemistry for the purpose of analysis and chromatography of proteins including modifications and spectroscopy. Having served as a CEO of this site, he started and was the CEO of Protein Advances Incorporated, "Protein AI", a bioinformatics company with proprietary drug discovery technology using artificial neural nets to identify new vaccine antigens, drugs and diagnostics. Years later, Protein AI was rebranded as PAI Life Sciences Inc., where he has been serving as a CEO since then.

In 2005 Carter co-founded Dharma Therapeutics Incorporated, a pharmaceutical firm focused in drug delivery. He then worked for this firm as the Chief Scientific Officer (CSO) prior to its Japanese parent company going public in Singapore. From 2007 until 2019, he held appointment as a Vice President of Adjuvant Technologies at the Infectious Disease Research Institute. While still in this position, he founded another company, Compliment Corporation. In 2019, he became co-founder and CSO of HDT Bio Corp, a Seattle, WA based startup company developing vaccines and immune therapies.

Carter also holds two concurrent academic appointments: as Affiliate Professor at the School of Medicine and in Global Health at the University of Washington.

== Research and development ==
Carter has contributed in the discovery and development of adjuvants, immune therapies, and vaccines. He has developed vaccines, diagnostics, adjuvants and immune-therapeutics and patented new ideas on antigens, vaccines, TLR agonists and their formulations.

=== Vaccines and innate immunity ===
Carter has worked on delivering healthcare solutions to developing countries. He helped produce a viable COVID-19 vaccine, as well as co-inventing the LION technology to deliver saRNA for use in industrialized and developing economies. This technology serves as the basis for the first saRNA vaccine authorized for human use. As part of his DARPA research, he developed and tested an influenza vaccine in humans that could be sent through the US mail in human clinical trials. In 2018, The Washington Post featured Carter's research regarding the development of adjuvants for influenza vaccine.

In his role as TB project leader, Carter's group moved the first recombinant TB subunit vaccine into human clinical trials and then transferred the technology to a large pharmaceutical manufacturer, GSK bio. The vaccine recently was shown to be the first new TB vaccine with significant efficacy. While working with GSK, he was also responsible for process development on a variety of proteins. He headed the bio-analytical group developing assays for what was a commercial product for non-Hodgkins lymphoma, Bexxar, a radiolabeled antibody. Later on, in 2011, he presented on the characterization of a new TLR4 agonist, glucopyranosyl lipid adjuvant (GLA), as well assessing the impacts of GLA on murine and human dendritic cells (DC). Finally, he brought a new TLR4 agonist, SLA, into human trials. This molecule safely initiates potent immune responses in humans.

In 2022 Carter's group led a new vaccine for schistosomiasis named SchistoShield into the clinic. This vaccine is being tested in the US.

=== Parasitology and oncology ===
Carter helped discover the implications of insertional tagging, cloning, and expression of the Toxoplasma gondii hypoxanthine-xanthine-guanine phosphoribosyltransferase gene as a selectable marker in the context of stable transformation. In early 2000s, he demonstrated protection against Leishmania major in murine and nonhuman primate models with purified leishmanial recombinant antigens. He also performed a study to evaluate how 'polyprotein vaccine' consisting of the T-cell antigens thiol-specific antioxidant, leishmania major stress-inducible protein 1, and leishmania elongation initiation factor, plays a significant role in terms of providing protection against leishmaniasis. He also described the characterization and purification of mammaglobin/lipophilin B complex, regarded as a promising diagnostic marker for breast cancer.

== Bibliography ==
- Donald, R. G., Carter, D., Ullman, B., & Roos, D. S. (1996). Insertional tagging, cloning, and expression of the Toxoplasma gondii hypoxanthine-xanthine-guanine phosphoribosyltransferase gene: use as a selectable marker for stable transformation. Journal of Biological Chemistry, 271(24), 14010-14019.
- Carter, D., Douglass, J. F., Cornellison, C. D., Retter, M. W., Johnson, J. C., Bennington, A. A., ... & Vedvick, T. S. (2002). Purification and characterization of the mammaglobin/lipophilin B complex, a promising diagnostic marker for breast cancer. Biochemistry, 41(21), 6714–6722.
- Coler, R. N., Skeiky, Y. A., Bernards, K., Greeson, K., Carter, D., Cornellison, C. D., ... & Reed, S. G. (2002). Immunization with a polyprotein vaccine consisting of the T-Cell antigens thiol-specific antioxidant, Leishmania major stress-inducible protein 1, and Leishmania elongation initiation factor protects against leishmaniasis. Infection and immunity, 70(8), 4215–4225.
- Coler, R. N., Bertholet, S., Moutaftsi, M., Guderian, J. A., Windish, H. P., Baldwin, S. L., ... & Reed, S. G. (2011). Development and characterization of synthetic glucopyranosyl lipid adjuvant system as a vaccine adjuvant. PloS one, 6(1), e16333.
- Erasmus, J. H., Khandhar, A. P., O'Connor, M. A., Walls, A. C., Hemann, E. A., Murapa, P., ... & Fuller, D. H. (2020). An Alphavirus-derived replicon RNA vaccine induces SARS-CoV-2 neutralizing antibody and T cell responses in mice and nonhuman primates. Science translational medicine, 12(555), eabc9396.
