= Primary cutaneous immunocytoma =

- Specialty: Dermatology/Oncology

Primary cutaneous immunocytoma was initially regarded as a distinct type of the cutaneous lymphomas of the skin. (The "primary" used to designate cutaneous lymphomas indicates that the lymphoma was first diagnosed as limited to the skin and there was no evidence of spread to extracutaneous tissues for 6 months after the diagnosis was first made.) A 1997 review characterized 16 cases of primary cutaneious immunocytomo as skin lesions located on the arms and legs that in 15 of 16 cases had an excellent responses to, and prognoses after, purely local treatments. On microscopic histological examination, these lesions consisted of B cells (a type of lymphocyte) and nodular or diffuse infiltrates of lymphoplasmacytoid-like plasma cells located at the periphery of these infiltrates. In 2004, however, the World Health Organization (i.e., WHO) and European Organisation for Research and Treatment of Cancer (i.e., EORTC) classified primary cutaneous immunocytoma as one form of the primary cutaneous marginal zone lymphomas or, as they are now termed, primary cutaneous marginal zone lymphoproliferative disorders.

== See also ==
- Primary cutaneous marginal zone lymphoma
- B-cell lymphoma
- Skin lesion
