= Small modular immunopharmaceutical =

Small modular immunopharmaceuticals, or SMIPs for short, are artificial proteins that are intended for use as pharmaceutical drugs. They are largely built from parts of antibodies (immunoglobulins), and like them have a binding site for antigens that could be used for monoclonal antibody therapy. SMIPs have similar biological half-life and, being smaller than antibodies, are reasoned to have better tissue penetration properties. They were invented by Trubion and are now being developed by Emergent BioSolutions, which acquired Trubion in 2010.

== Structure ==
Sketch of a SMIP monomer consisting of four domains. The antigen binding site is on the left edge. scFv: modified single-chain variable fragment Fc: one half of a fragment crystallizable region V_{H}: heavy chain variable domain V_{L}: light chain variable domain C_{H}2: constant domain 2 C_{H}3: constant domain 3 (effector domain) Arrows: linker peptide (left) and hinge region (right) N: N-terminus C: C-terminus

SMIPs are single-chain proteins that comprise one binding region, one hinge region as a connector, and one effector domain. The binding region is a modified single-chain variable fragment (scFv), and the rest of the protein can be constructed from the fragment crystallizable region (Fc) and the hinge region of an immunoglobulin G_{1} (IgG_{1}). Genetically modified cells produce SMIPs as antibody-like dimers, which are about 30% smaller than real antibodies.

Like ordinary monoclonal antibodies, SMIPs are monospecific, meaning they recognize and attach to a single antigen target to initiate their biological activity. SMIP drug candidates are intended to target antigens with the same specificity and predictable biological activity as monoclonal antibodies. Examples are TRU-015, a CD20 targeting SMIP under research for rheumatoid arthritis, and TRU-016, a CD37 targeting potential treatment for chronic lymphocytic leukemia and other B-cell cancers.

== Production ==
A monoclonal antibody targeting the desired antigen can be developed the classical way, using hybridoma technology. The scFv is then constructed from the antibody's variable regions. A large number of different hinge regions and effector domains are taken from libraries of immunoglobulins, and the combined proteins are produced in genetically modified (transfected) cells and screened for clones with useful properties like high binding specificity. The selected protein is multiplied in transfected cells suitable for medium- or large-scale production, for example Chinese hamster ovary cells, and purified by chromatography.
