= C6416H9874N1688O1987S44 =

The molecular formula C_{6416}H_{9874}N_{1688}O_{1987}S_{44} (molar mass: 143858.028 g/mol) may refer to:

- Rituximab
- Tositumomab
