= Primary cutaneous follicle center lymphoma =

- Other names: PCFCL
- Specialty: Hematology/oncology

Primary cutaneous follicle center lymphoma is a type of lymphoma. It was recognized as a distinct disease entity in the 2008 WHO classification. PCFCL had been previously conceived as a variant of follicular lymphoma (FL).

== Cause ==
Unlike FL, PCFCL is not typically associated with t(14;18) translocation although presence of that translocation does not exclude PCFCL. It is usually not associated with overexpressed Bcl-2.

PCFCL represents about 55% to 60% of primary cutaneous B-cell lymphomas (PCBCL); primary cutaneous marginal zone lymphoma and diffuse large B-cell cell lymphoma, leg type are the other primary cutaneous B-cell lymphomas. The cause of PCFCL is unknown.

== Treatment ==
Surgical removal and/or radiotherapy is given for localized disease. Radiation using multiple radiation fields is given if the disease has wider extent with grouped lesions. For the less common situation of more extensive disease (still confined to skin), rituximab without chemotherapy is used. Intralesional interferon alpha (IFN-α) and intralesional rituximab have been used. Approximately one-third of PCFCL relapse, usually in the skin; treatment is similar to initial management and overall survival remains excellent.

== Prognosis ==
Spread from the skin is unusual, and the prognosis is excellent with a 5-year survival of over 97%. The International Extranodal Lymphoma Study Group identified elevated LDH, more than two skin lesions, and nodular lesions as three prognostic factors, that are used to assess a cutaneous lymphoma international prognostic index (CLIPI), which is prognostic of disease-free status.

== See also ==
- Cutaneous B-cell lymphoma
- Primary cutaneous large B-cell lymphoma
- Follicular lymphoma
