= Ocaratuzumab =

Monoclonal antibody

Monoclonal antibody
- Type: ?
- Source: Humanized
- Target: CD20

Clinical data
- ATC code: none

Identifiers
- CAS Number: 1169956-08-4
- ChemSpider: none
- UNII: NTY9893GD0
- KEGG: D10482

Chemical and physical data
- Formula: C_{6464}H_{10016}N_{1712}O_{2010}S_{44}
- Molar mass: 145283.85 g·mol^{−1}

Ocaratuzumab (AME-133v, LY2469298) is a humanized monoclonal antibody designed for the treatment of cancer and autoimmune disorders. The antibody is engineered for enhanced affinity to the CD20 antigen on B-lymphocytes, increased antibody-dependent cell-mediated cytotoxicity (ADCC), and for improved treatment of low-affinity FcγRIIIa allotypes.

Phase I/II trials in relapsed/refractory follicular lymphoma have been completed in the United States (US) and Japan, and a Phase I trial was conducted in US rheumatoid arthritis patients. Phase III development in relapsed follicular lymphoma patients is underway. Many patients relapse following currently available treatments, and a significant need for new effective treatment exists, particularly for patients with low-affinity FcγRIIIa allotypes. In pre-clinical studies, ocaratuzumab was shown to have 13 to 20 fold greater affinity for CD20 and 6 fold more potent ADCC as compared to rituximab. Additional development in other oncology and rheumatology indications will also be pursued, as well as subcutaneous formations for patient convenience.

This drug is currently being developed by Mentrik Biotech, LLC.

== History ==
AME-133v is a humanized IgG1 monoclonal antibody targeting the CD20 antigen on both healthy and malignant B-lymphocytes, engineered at Applied Molecular Evolution. Libraries of antibody Fab (fragment, antigen binding) regions were generated with codon substituted variations of the antibody complementarity determining regions (CDRs) inserted into human antibody light and heavy chain germline frameworks (data on file at Mentrik Biotec). Variants were expressed and selected based on increased binding affinity to CD20 (data on file at Mentrik Biotech). A variable region with increased binding activity for CD20 was selected and developed as AME-133v (data on file at Mentrik Biotech). AME-133v was purchased by Eli Lilly, received the name LY2469298, and a Phase I/II clinical trial in follicular lymphoma was conducted in the U.S. as well as a Phase I clinical trial in rheumatoid arthritis initiated in the U.S. (data shown below). A Phase I clinical trial in follicular lymphoma was also conducted in Japan. AME-133v was purchased by Mentrik, Biotech in 2011 and received the generic name ocaratuzumab from the United States Adopted Name Council in December 2011.
