= Trubion =

- Company type: Public company
- Traded as: Nasdaq: TRBN
- Industry: Biopharmaceutical
- Founded: 1999
- Fate: acquired by Emergent BioSolutions (2010)
- Headquarters: Seattle, WA
- Products: Protein-based therapeutics
- Website: www.trubion.com

Trubion was a publicly held biopharmaceutical company that was focused on creating a pipeline of protein-based therapeutic product candidates to treat autoimmune and inflammatory diseases and cancer. Trubion was acquired by Emergent BioSolutions on October 28, 2010. Trubion was established in 1999 in the State of Washington as an early stage development company, and was later reincorporated in October 2002 in the State of Delaware.

In December 2005, Trubion entered into a collaborative agreement with Wyeth for the development and worldwide commercialization of CD20-directed therapeutics. The agreement also included the development and worldwide commercialization of certain other product candidates directed to targets other than CD20. The research portion of Trubion's contract with Wyeth extended through December 22, 2009.

== Former product pipeline ==
Name	Platform	Indication	Status	Collaboration	Research
TRU-015	SMIP	Rheumatoid arthritis	Phase 2b	Wyeth	Phase 2b initiation EULAR data
SBI-087	SMIP	Rheumatoid arthritis	Phase 1	Wyeth	Recent data
SBI-087	SMIP	Systemic lupus erythematosus	Phase 1	Wyeth	
TRU-016	SMIP	Chronic lymphocytic leukemia	Phase 1/2	Trubion Proprietary Technology	ASCO 2008 Poster Presentation
TRU-016	SMIP	Non-Hodgkin lymphoma	Pre-clinical	Trubion Proprietary Technology	
TRU-016	SMIP	Autoimmune disease and inflammation	Pre-clinical	Trubion Proprietary Technology	

== Former technology ==
Trubion's product development efforts were focused on three technology pillars: SMIP protein therapeutics, SCORPION protein therapeutics, and TRU-ADhanCe potency enhancing technology for immunopharmaceuticals.

SMIP, or small modular immunopharmaceutical, therapeutics are single chain polypeptides comprising one binding domain, one hinge domain and one effector domain designed in an effort to meet predetermined therapeutic specifications for specific diseases. SMIP therapeutics are mono-specific (they recognize and attach to single antigen targets and initiate biological activity). Trubion worked on SMIP drug candidates that targeted validated antigens with the same specificity and predictable biological activity as mAbs.

SCORPION protein therapeutics are also single chain polypeptides composed of functional domains from naturally occurring proteins. The difference between SMIP and SCORPION technologies is that SCORPION compounds are multi-specific therapeutics that are capable of targeting two or more antigens simultaneously.

TRU-ADhanCe potency enhancing technology was designed to enhance the potency of existing therapies that work through Fc-directed or antibody-directed cellular cytotoxicity, or ADCC. TRU-ADhanCe technology could be applied late in development to established manufacturing lines and generate candidates with increased ADCC and longer in vivo half lives.
