= Vipivotide tetraxetan =

Radiopharmaceutical precursor

Clinical data
- Other names: PSMA-617

Identifiers
- IUPAC name: (2S)-2-[[(1S)-1-carboxy-5-[[(2S)-3-naphthalen-2-yl-2-[[4-[[[2-[4,7,10-tris(carboxymethyl)-1,4,7,10-tetrazacyclododec-1-yl]acetyl]amino]methyl]cyclohexanecarbonyl]amino]propanoyl]amino]pentyl]carbamoylamino]pentanedioic acid
- CAS Number: 1702967-37-0
- PubChem CID: 122706786
- ChemSpider: 72380176
- UNII: 4YM1W0EGQ5
- KEGG: D11697
- ChEMBL: ChEMBL4594280
- PDB ligand: QYF (PDBe, RCSB PDB)

Chemical and physical data
- Formula: C_{49}H_{71}N_{9}O_{16}
- Molar mass: 1042.154 g·mol^{−1}
- 3D model (JSmol): Interactive image
- SMILES: C1CC(CCC1CNC(=O)CN2CCN(CCN(CCN(CC2)CC(=O)O)CC(=O)O)CC(=O)O)C(=O)N[C@@H](CC3=CC4=CC=CC=C4C=C3)C(=O)NCCCC[C@@H](C(=O)O)NC(=O)N[C@@H](CCC(=O)O)C(=O)O
- InChI: InChI=InChI=1S/C49H71N9O16/c59-40(28-55-17-19-56(29-42(62)63)21-23-58(31-44(66)67)24-22-57(20-18-55)30-43(64)65)51-27-32-8-12-35(13-9-32)45(68)52-39(26-33-10-11-34-5-1-2-6-36(34)25-33)46(69)50-16-4-3-7-37(47(70)71)53-49(74)54-38(48(72)73)14-15-41(60)61/h1-2,5-6,10-11,25,32,35,37-39H,3-4,7-9,12-24,26-31H2,(H,50,69)(H,51,59)(H,52,68)(H,60,61)(H,62,63)(H,64,65)(H,66,67)(H,70,71)(H,72,73)(H2,53,54,74)/t32?,35?,37-,38-,39-/m0/s1; Key:JBHPLHATEXGMQR-VLOIPPKDSA-N

Vipivotide tetraxetan (also known as PSMA-617) is a radiopharmaceutical precursor molecule used in targeted therapies for prostate cancer and other tumors expressing prostate-specific membrane antigen (PSMA).

PSMA-617 is a high-affinity inhibitor of the peptidase activity of PSMA, with a K_{i} of 0.37 nM. It consists of a PSMA-targeting moiety conjugated to a high-affinity chelator for metal isotopes. Its strong binding affinity for PSMA allows precise targeting of cancer cells that overexpress this protein, especially in prostate cancer.

Vipivotide tetraxetan is used as a precursor in the synthesis of radiopharmaceuticals such as Lu-PSMA-617 and Ac-PSMA-617. In Lu-PSMA-617, vipivotide tetraxetan chelates the radioactive isotope lutetium-177, a β-emitter used in targeted radioligand therapy. In Ac-PSMA-617, it binds actinium-225, an α-emitter used in targeted alpha-particle therapy.

== Chemistry ==
The compound's structure includes a PSMA-binding motif (Lys-urea-Glu), a hydrophobic linker (composed of 2-naphthyl-l-Ala and cyclohexyl groups), and a DOTA chelator for radiolabeling.

== Nomenclature ==
Vipivotide tetraxetan is the International Nonproprietary Name (INN) and United States Adopted Name (USAN) for the ligand-targeting and metal-chelating components, respectively, of the radiopharmaceutical drugs Lu-PSMA-617 and Ac-PSMA-617.

"Vipivotide" refers to the peptide-based targeting moiety (Lys-urea-Glu) that binds specifically to prostate-specific membrane antigen (PSMA) on prostate cancer cells. The suffix "tide" denotes the peptide nature of this moiety.

"Tetraxetan" refers to the chelator moiety, a chemical group that binds metal ions within the molecule. The name "tetraxetan" is derived from "tetraazacyclododecane tetra-acetic acid" (DOTA), a well-known macrocyclic chelator that securely holds the radioactive isotope in the drug. The "tetra-" prefix indicates the four nitrogen atoms in the macrocycle and the four acetic acid arms in the DOTA structure, while "xetan" is a standard suffix for chelators.
