= Tositumomab =

Pharmaceutical drug

Monoclonal antibody
- Type: Whole antibody
- Source: Mouse
- Target: CD20

Clinical data
- Trade names: Bexxar
- AHFS/Drugs.com: Monograph
- MedlinePlus: a609013
- ATC code: V10XA53 (WHO) (sequential regimen with ^{131}I form)

Identifiers
- CAS Number: 208921-02-2
- DrugBank: DB00081
- ChemSpider: none
- UNII: 0343IGH41U
- KEGG: D08622
- ChEMBL: ChEMBL1201604

Chemical and physical data
- Formula: C_{6416}H_{9874}N_{1688}O_{1987}S_{44}
- Molar mass: 143860.04 g·mol^{−1}

Tositumomab is a murine monoclonal antibody which targets the CD20 antigen produced in mammalian cell. It was combined with iodine-131 to produce a radiopharmaceutical for unsealed source radiotherapy, Iodine-131 Tositumomab (branded as Bexxar), for the treatment of non-Hodgkins lymphoma. It is classified as a IgG2a lambda antibody.

The drug combination was developed by Corixa which was purchased by GlaxoSmithKline in 2005. It was sold for about $25,000 for one round of treatment. Bexxar competed with Zevalin, until the former's discontinuation in 2014.

== Clinical use ==
A personalized regimen using Bexxar was approved for the treatment of relapsed or chemotherapy/rituxan-refractory Non-Hodgkin lymphoma in 2003.

The radioactive dose was adjusted for each patient in order to maximize the radiation delivered to the tumor and minimize the exposure of other organs. Bexxar combined separate administration of unlabelled and iodine-labelled (i.e. covalently bonded to ^{131}I) tositumomab. A first dose of labelled antibody was given once, and whole-body radiation was measured with a gamma camera over seven days. Analysis of that imaging data allowed an optimal dose of labelled antibody to be calculated, which was then administered once a day, for up to seven days. Each time the labelled antibody was administered, it was always preceded by unlabelled (non-radioactive) antibody. Early clinical trials had shown that total body residence times of radioactivity were longer in people who first received unlabelled antibody, so that a lower dose of labelled antibody was needed to deliver the required total dose of radiation; additionally labelled antibody targeted tumors better in people pre-treated with unlabelled antibody.

== Availability ==
=== United States ===
Following a first investigational new drug application in 1989 and biologics license application in 2000, Bexxar was approved by the FDA in 2003. Sale of Bexxar was discontinued and marketing approval was withdrawn in February 2014 due to a decline in usage (fewer than 75 patients in 2012). One possible explanation for the lack of demand, despite a claimed 70% response rate, was that oncologists could not sell it directly to patients but had to refer patients to third party specialist centers, however a "muddled clinical trials strategy", supply chain issues, reimbursement problems, and emergence of non-radioactive competitors has also been blamed.

=== Europe ===
The European Medicines Agency granted tositumomab and ^{131}I-tositumomab orphan drug status, for the treatment of follicular lymphoma, to Amersham plc in 2003. This was withdrawn in October 2015 at the request of the new owner, GlaxoSmithKline.
