= Cutaneous B-cell lymphoma =

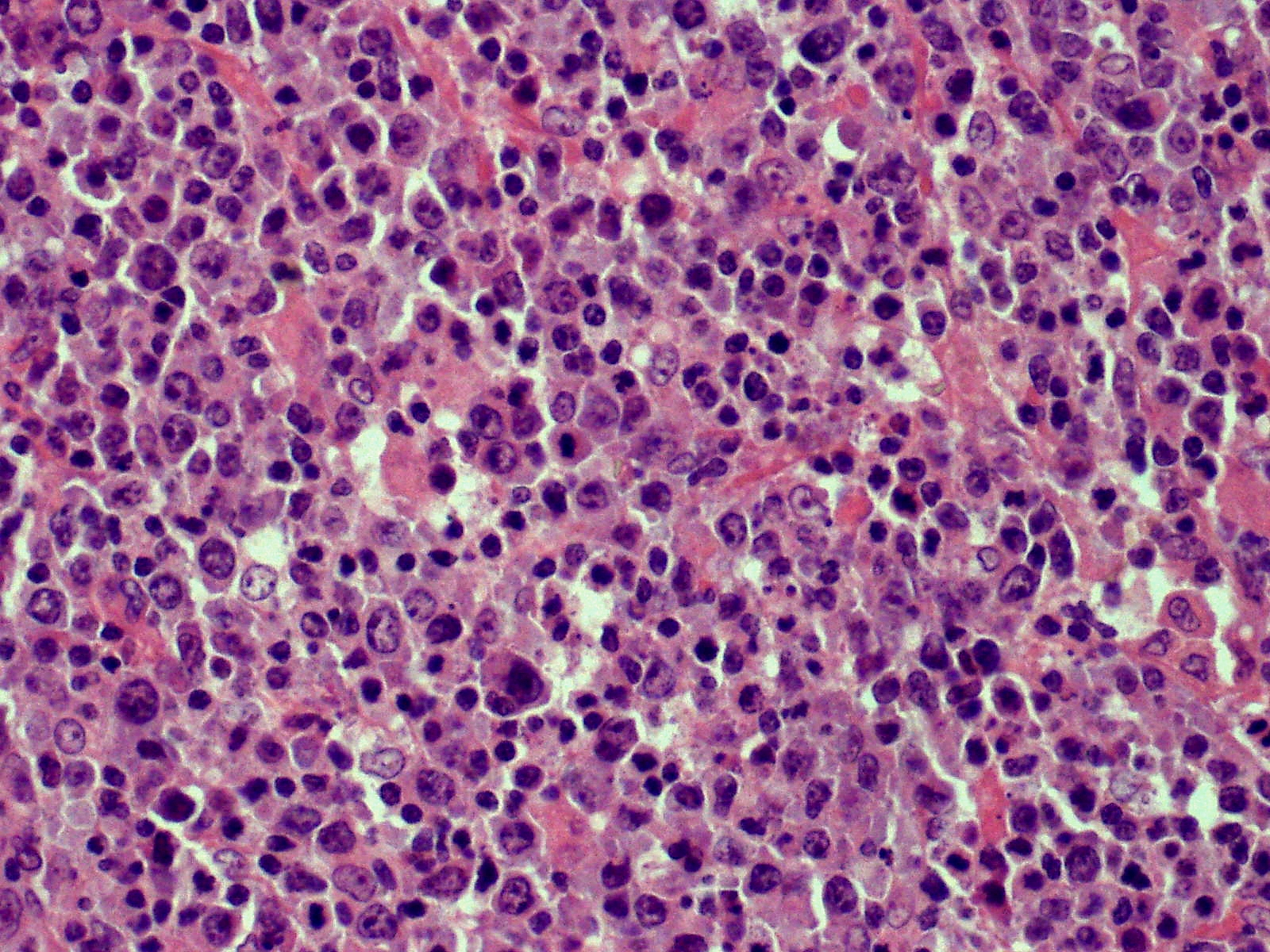
- Cutaneous diffuse large B-cell lymphoma
- Specialty: Dermatology/Oncology

Cutaneous B-cell lymphomas (CBCL), more recently termed Primary cutaneous B-cell lymphomas and lymphoproliferative disorders (PCBCLPD), are a group of disorders that typically present as skin lesions consisting of proliferating B-cells. B-cells are a type of lymphocyte involved in regulating immune responses. (The "primary" used to designate cutaneous lymphomas indicates that the lymphoma was first diagnosed as limited to the skin and there was no evidence of spread to extracutaneous tissues for 6 months after the diagnosis was first made.) Since its original definition in 1997, CBCL has been considered to have a varying number of subtypes by the European Organisation for Research and Treatment of Cancer, i.e., EORTC, and World Health Organization, i.e., WHO. The latest revised classification of CBCL, which was published by EORTC in 2022, lists the following three main subtypes of CBCL (now termed PCBCLPD):

- Primary cutaneous marginal zone lymphoproliferative disorder (formerly termed primary cutaneous marginal zone lymphoma)
- Primary cutaneous follicular lymphoma (also termed primary cutaneous follicular center lymphoma or primary cutaneous follicular centre lymphoma)
- Primary cutaneous diffuse large B-cell lymphoma, leg type

Because recent studies had shown that primary cutaneous marginal zone lymphoma, which was formerly classified as a subtype of the MALT lymphomas: a) has a distinct microscopic histology and gene expression profile; b) spreads to extracutaneous tissue in only 4 to 8.5% of cases; c) has a 5 year disease-specific survival in excess of 99% even in patients not receiving aggressive therapy; and d) has pathological findings that overlap the benign cutaneous disorders termed cutaneous lymphoid hyperplasia. Consequently, EORTC, 2022, renamed primary cutaneous marginal zone lymphoma as primary cutaneous marginal zone lymphoproliferative disorder. Primary cutaneous follicle center lymphoma is also an indolent lymphoma. The majority of patients achieve complete remissions following surgery and/or radiation therapy. Its spread to extracutaneous tissues is rare (10%) and has a 5-year overall survival and disease-specific survival of 87% and 95%, respectively. Primary cutaneous diffuse large B-cell lymphoma, leg type is an aggressive B-cell lymphoma that is often resistant to therapy and carries a poor prognosis, i.e., they have a 5-year disease-specific survival rate of 43% or 70% depending on whether their cancer cells have or do not have, respectively, inactivating mutations in both of their CDKN2A genes.
