= Infectious Disease Research Institute =

US nonprofit organization

Coordinates: 47°38′3.1″N 122°19′28.7″W

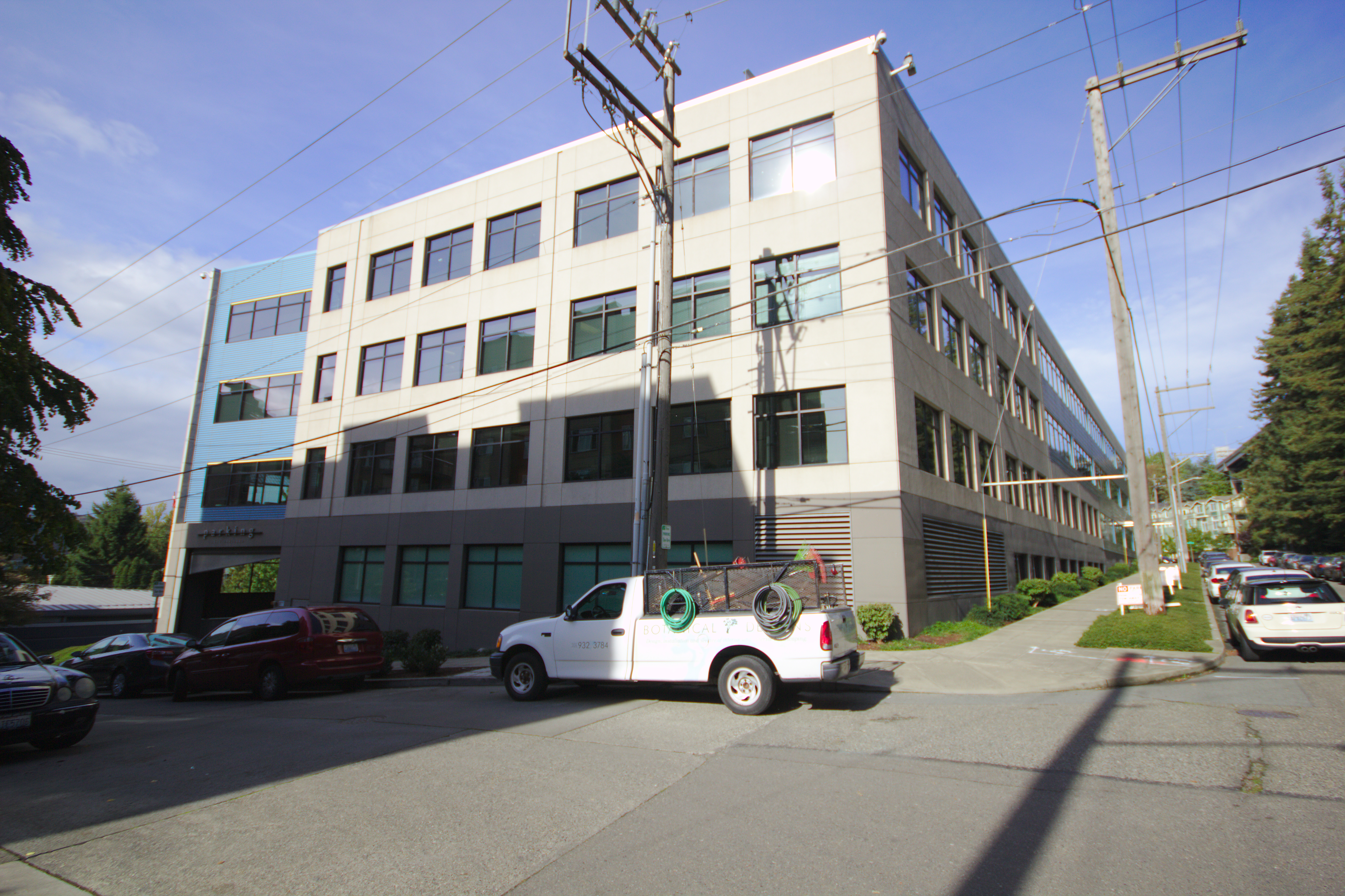
Site of IDRI's facility in the Eastlake neighborhood of Seattle

The Infectious Disease Research Institute (IDRI) was a non-profit organization based in Seattle, in the United States, and which conducts global health research on infectious diseases. Its new name is Access to Advanced Health Institute (AAHI).

== History ==
IDRI was founded in 1993, by Steve Reed, PhD.

== Malaria vaccine ==
IDRI is collaborating with the United States Agency for International Development to develop a malaria vaccine with the Walter Reed Army Institute of Research using Walter Reed's CelTOS malaria antigen in conjunction with IDRI's GLA-SE adjuvant.

== Visceral leishmaniasis vaccine ==
In February 2012, IDRI launched the world's first clinical trial of the visceral leishmaniasis vaccine. The vaccine is a recombinant form of two fused Leishmania parasite proteins with an adjuvant. Two phase 1 clinical trials with healthy volunteers are to be conducted. The first one takes place in Washington and is followed by a trial in India. The trials are funded by the Bill & Melinda Gates Foundation.
