= Lutetium (177Lu) vipivotide tetraxetan =

Radiopharmaceutical medication

Lutetium (^{177}Lu) vipivotide tetraxetan

Clinical data
- Trade names: Pluvicto
- Other names: Lu-PSMA-617, Lutetium (^{177}Lu) vipivotide tetraxetan, Lutetium Lu 177 vipivotide tetraxetan (USAN US)
- AHFS/Drugs.com: Micromedex Detailed Consumer Information
- MedlinePlus: a622063
- License data: US DailyMed: Pluvicto
- Pregnancy category: AU: X (High risk)
- Routes of administration: Intravenous
- Drug class: Radiopharmaceutical
- ATC code: V10XX05 (WHO)

Legal status
- Legal status: AU: S4 (Prescription only); CA: ℞-only / Schedule C; US: ℞-only; EU: Rx-only

Identifiers
- IUPAC name: Lutetium-177 2-[4-[2-[[4-[[(2S)-1-[[(5S)-5-carboxy-5-[[(1S)-1,3-dicarboxypropyl]carbamoylamino]pentyl]amino]-3-naphthalen-2-yl-1-oxopropan-2-yl]carbamoyl]cyclohexyl]methylamino]-2-oxoethyl]-7,10-bis(carboxylatomethyl)-1,4,7,10-tetrazacyclododec-1-yl]acetate
- CAS Number: 1703749-62-5
- PubChem CID: 122706785
- DrugBank: DB16778
- ChemSpider: 58828499
- UNII: G6UF363ECX
- KEGG: D12335

Chemical and physical data
- Formula: C_{49}H_{71}LuN_{9}O_{16}
- Molar mass: 1217.121 g·mol^{−1}
- 3D model (JSmol): Interactive image
- SMILES: [177Lu+3].OC(=O)CC[C@H](NC(=O)N[C@@H](CCCCNC(=O)[C@H](Cc1ccc2ccccc2c1)NC(=O)[C@@H]3CC[C@@H](CNC(=O)CN4CCN(CC(=O)[O-])CCN(CC(=O)[O-])CCN(CC(=O)[O-])CC4)CC3)C(=O)O)C(=O)O
- InChI: InChI=1S/C49H71N9O16.Lu/c59-40(28-55-17-19-56(29-42(62)63)21-23-58(31-44(66)67)24-22-57(20-18-55)30-43(64)65)51-27-32-8-12-35(13-9-32)45(68)52-39(26-33-10-11-34-5-1-2-6-36(34)25-33)46(69)50-16-4-3-7-37(47(70)71)53-49(74)54-38(48(72)73)14-15-41(60)61;/h1-2,5-6,10-11,25,32,35,37-39H,3-4,7-9,12-24,26-31H2,(H,50,69)(H,51,59)(H,52,68)(H,60,61)(H,62,63)(H,64,65)(H,66,67)(H,70,71)(H,72,73)(H2,53,54,74);/q;+3/p-3/t32-,35-,37-,38-,39-;/m0./s1/i;1+2; Key:RSTDSVVLNYFDHY-BGOLSCJMSA-K

Lutetium (^{177}Lu) vipivotide tetraxetan (INN), sold under the brand name Pluvicto, is a radiopharmaceutical medication used for the treatment of prostate-specific membrane antigen (PSMA)-positive metastatic castration-resistant prostate cancer (mCRPC). Lutetium (^{177}Lu) vipivotide tetraxetan is a targeted radioligand therapy.

The most common adverse reactions include fatigue, dry mouth, nausea, anemia, decreased appetite, and constipation.

Lutetium (^{177}Lu) vipivotide tetraxetan is a radioconjugate composed of vipivotide tetraxetan (PSMA-617), a human prostate-specific membrane antigen (PSMA)-targeting ligand, conjugated to the beta-emitting radioisotope lutetium-177, with potential antineoplastic activity against PSMA-expressing tumor cells. Upon intravenous administration of Lutetium (^{177}Lu) vipivotide tetraxetan, it targets and binds to PSMA-expressing tumor cells. Upon binding, PSMA-expressing tumor cells are destroyed by ^{177}Lu through the specific delivery of beta particle radiation. PSMA, a tumor-associated antigen and type II transmembrane protein, is expressed on the membrane of prostatic epithelial cells and overexpressed on prostate tumor cells.

Lutetium (^{177}Lu) vipivotide tetraxetan was approved for medical use in the United States in March 2022, and in the European Union in December 2022. The US Food and Drug Administration considers it to be a first-in-class medication.

== Medical uses ==
Lutetium (^{177}Lu) vipivotide tetraxetan is indicated for the treatment of adults with prostate-specific membrane antigen-positive metastatic castration-resistant prostate cancer who have been treated with androgen receptor pathway inhibition and taxane-based chemotherapy.

In March 2025, the US Food and Drug Administration (FDA) expanded the indication for Lutetium (^{177}Lu) vipivotide tetraxetan to include adults with prostate-specific membrane antigen-positive metastatic castration-resistant prostate cancer who have been treated with androgen receptor pathway inhibitor therapy and are considered appropriate to delay taxane-based chemotherapy.

In July 2026, the FDA approved lutetium (^{177}Lu) vipivotide tetraxetan in combination with androgen receptor pathway inhibitor therapy for adults with prostate-specific membrane antigen (PSMA)-positive metastatic androgen pathway modulation-naïve or-sensitive (mAPMN/S) prostate cancer (previously referred to as metastatic hormone-sensitive prostate cancer).

== Side effects ==
The most common adverse reactions include fatigue, dry mouth, nausea, anemia, decreased appetite, and constipation.

The US prescribing information includes warnings and precautions for the risk of radiation exposure, myelosuppression, renal toxicity, embryo-fetal toxicity, and infertility.

== History ==
In 2006, scientists designed a targeting ligand that bound with high affinity and specificity to PSMA on prostate cancer cells and patented its ability to target attached radionuclides such as ^{177}Lu, ^{99m}Tc, ^{68}Ga, etc. to prostate cancers. The patents were licensed to Endocyte in 2007. In 2012, scientists at improved the drug's affinity, patented, and licensed to ABX advanced biomedical compounds, a small German pharmaceutical company, for early clinical development. In 2017, the ABX patent was also acquired by Endocyte and Endocyte together with the above two sets of patents was acquired by Novartis in 2018.

Efficacy and safety was initially investigated as a compassionate access treatment in Germany with high tumor targeting and low doses to normal organs. Physician-scientists from the Peter MacCallum Cancer Centre conducted a phase 2 trial demonstrating high response rates, low toxicity and reduction in pain in men with metastatic castration-resistant cancer who progressed after conventional treatments. The ANZUP co-operative trials conducted the first randomized, multicentre trial comparing lutetium vipivotide tetraxetan to cabazitaxel chemotherapy.

Efficacy was evaluated in VISION, a randomized (2:1), multicenter, open-label trial that evaluated Lu-PSMA-617 plus best standard of care (BSoC) (n=551) or BSoC alone (n=280) in men with progressive, prostate-specific membrane antigen (PSMA)-positive metastatic castration-resistant prostate cancer. All participants received a GnRH analog or had prior bilateral orchiectomy. Participants were required to have received at least one androgen receptor pathway inhibitor, and 1 or 2 prior taxane-based chemotherapy regimens. Participants received Lu-PSMA-617 7.4 GBq (200 mCi) every 6 weeks for up to a total of 6 doses plus BSoC or BSoC alone.

Efficacy was evaluated in PSMAfore (NCT04689828), a randomized, multicenter, open-label trial enrolling 468 participants with prostate-specific membrane antigen-positive metastatic castration-resistant prostate cancer and progression on one androgen receptor pathway inhibitor, who the investigator considered appropriate for delay of taxane-based chemotherapy. Participants were randomized (1:1) to receive Lu-PSMA-617 (7.4 GBq [200 mCi] every six weeks for six doses) or a change in androgen receptor pathway inhibitor. Participants who progressed on the androgen receptor pathway inhibitor arm were allowed to crossover to the experimental therapy.

The US Food and Drug Administration granted the application for Lutetium (^{177}Lu) vipivotide tetraxetan priority review and breakthrough therapy designations.

Efficacy for lutetium (^{177}Lu) vipivotide tetraxetan used with in combination with androgen receptor pathway inhibitor therapy was evaluated in PSMAddition (NCT04720157), a randomized, multicenter, open-label trial in participants with PSMA-positive mAPMN/S prostate cancer. Participants were randomized (1:1) to receive either lutetium (^{177}Lu) vipivotide tetraxetan (7.4 GBq [200 mCi] every 6 weeks for 6 doses) in combination with an androgen receptor pathway inhibitor (n=572) or an androgen receptor pathway inhibitor alone (n=572). The administered androgen receptor pathway inhibitor per investigator's choice included abiraterone, apalutamide, enzalutamide, darolutamide, or another androgen receptor pathway inhibitor. Treatment with androgen receptor pathway inhibitor in both arms could be continued until progressive disease or unacceptable toxicity. Participants received a gonadotropin-releasing hormone agonist or antagonist concurrently or had a bilateral orchiectomy.

== Legal status ==
Lutetium (^{177}Lu) vipivotide tetraxetan was approved for medical use in the United States in March 2022, and in the European Union in December 2022.

== Names ==
Lutetium (^{177}Lu) vipivotide tetraxetan is the international nonproprietary name and the United States Adopted Name.

Lutetium (^{177}Lu) vipivotide tetraxetan is sold under the brand name Pluvicto.
