= ATC code V10 =

ATC code V10 Therapeutic radiopharmaceuticals is a therapeutic subgroup of the Anatomical Therapeutic Chemical Classification System, a system of alphanumeric codes developed by the World Health Organization (WHO) for the classification of drugs and other medical products. Subgroup V10 is part of the anatomical group V Various.

Codes for veterinary use (ATCvet codes) can be created by placing the letter Q in front of the human ATC code: for example, QV10.
National versions of the ATC classification may include additional codes not present in this list, which follows the WHO version.

== V10A Anti-inflammatory agents ==
=== V10AA Yttrium (^{90}Y) compounds ===
V10AA01 Yttrium (^{90}Y) citrate colloid
V10AA02 Yttrium (^{90}Y) ferrihydroxide colloid
V10AA03 Yttrium (^{90}Y) silicate colloid

=== V10AX Other anti-inflammatory therapeutic radiopharmaceuticals ===
V10AX01 Phosphorus (^{32}P) chromicphosphate colloid
V10AX02 Samarium (^{153}Sm) hydroxyapatite colloid
V10AX03 Dysprosium (^{165}Dy) colloid
V10AX04 Erbium (^{169}Er) citrate colloid
V10AX05 Rhenium (^{186}Re) sulfide colloid
V10AX06 Gold (^{198}Au) colloidal

== V10B Pain palliation (bone seeking agents) ==
=== V10BX Various pain palliation radiopharmaceuticals ===
V10BX01 Strontium (^{89}Sr) chloride
V10BX02 Samarium (^{153}Sm) lexidronam
V10BX03 Rhenium (^{186}Re) etidronic acid

== V10X Other therapeutic radiopharmaceuticals ==
=== V10XA Iodine (^{131}I) compounds ===
V10XA01 Sodium iodide (^{131}I)
V10XA02 Iobenguane (^{131}I)
V10XA03 Iodine (^{131}I) omburtamab
V10XA04 Iodine (^{131}I) apamistamab
V10XA53 Tositumomab/iodine (^{131}I) tositumomab

=== V10XX Various therapeutic radiopharmaceuticals ===
V10XX01 Sodium phosphate (^{32}P)
V10XX02 Ibritumomab tiuxetan (^{90}Y)
V10XX03 Radium (^{223}Ra) dichloride
V10XX04 Lutetium (^{177}Lu) oxodotreotide
V10XX05 Lutetium (^{177}Lu) vipivotide tetraxetan
