= CD20 =

Mammalian protein found in humans

MS4A1
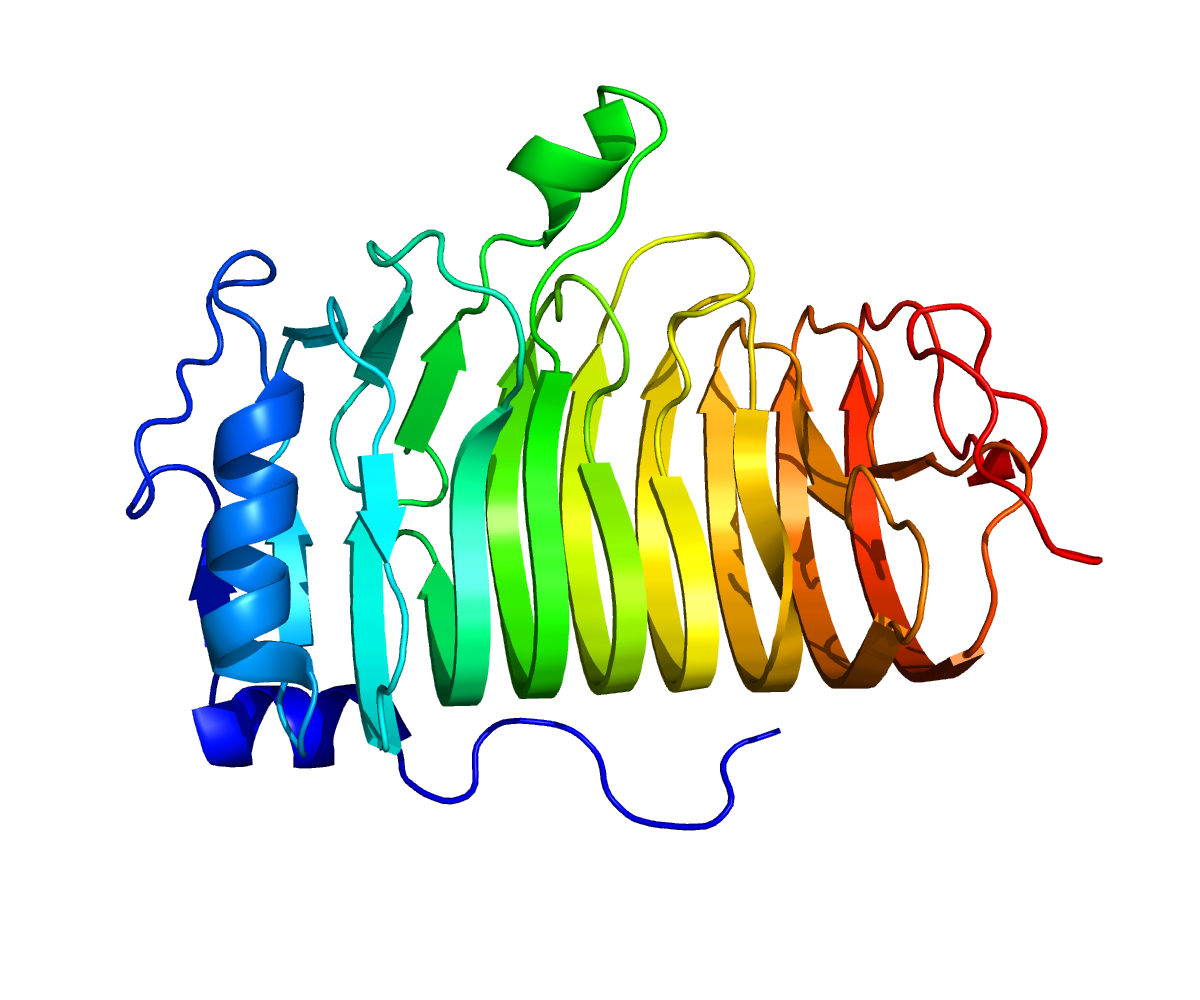

Identifiers
- Aliases: MS4A1, B1, Bp35, CD20, CVID5, LEU-16, MS4A2, S7, membrane spanning 4-domains A1, FMC7
- External IDs: OMIM: 112210; MGI: 88321; GeneCards: MS4A1
Available structures
PDB	Ortholog search: PDBe RCSB
PDB	List of PDB id codes 3PP4, 2OSL, 3BKY

Gene location (Human)
Chr.	Chromosome 11 (human)
Band	11q12.2	Start	60,455,846 bp
Band	11q12.2	End	60,470,752 bp

Gene location (Mouse)
Chr.	Chromosome 19 (mouse)
Band	19 A|19 8.19 cM	Start	11,227,039 bp
Band	19 A|19 8.19 cM	End	11,243,605 bp
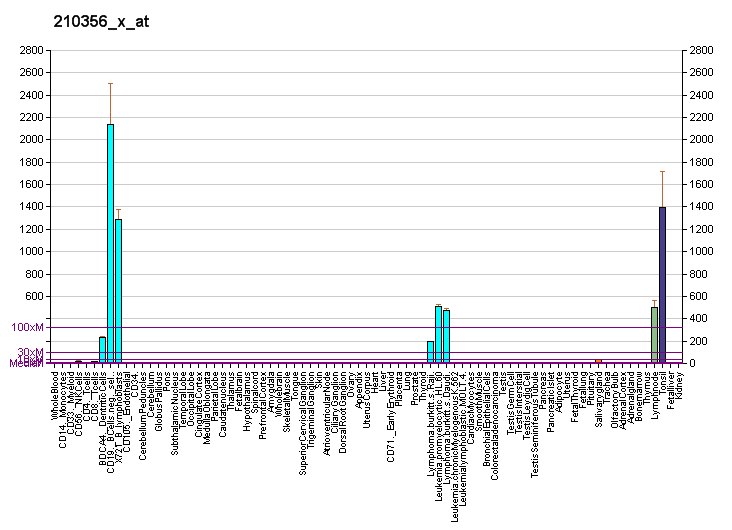

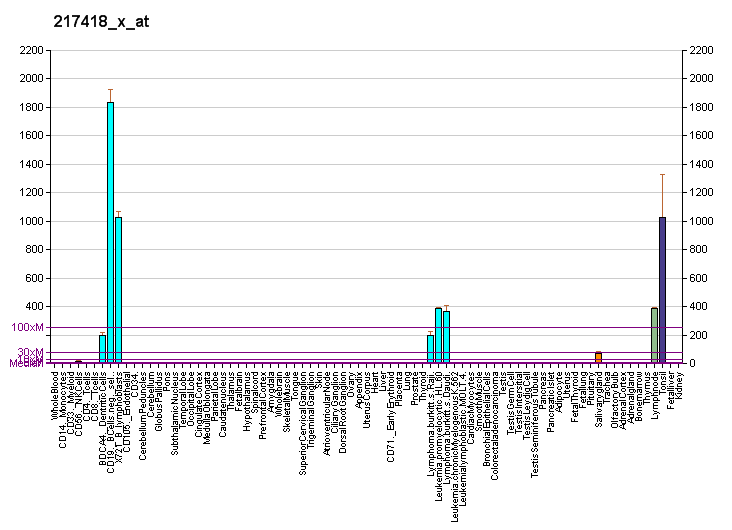
RNA expression pattern
Bgee	Human / Mouse (ortholog); Top expressed in: epithelium of nasopharynx; spleen; lymph node; mucosa of ileum; appendix; granulocyte; blood; tonsil; bone marrow; superficial temporal artery / Top expressed in: mesenteric lymph nodes; spleen; blood; oocyte; primary oocyte; submandibular gland; tibiofemoral joint; secondary oocyte; zygote; Ileal epithelium; More reference expression data
BioGPS	More reference expression data
Gene ontology
Molecular function	epidermal growth factor receptor binding; protein binding; MHC class II protein complex binding
Cellular component	integral component of membrane; plasma membrane; integral component of plasma membrane; extracellular exosome; membrane; external side of plasma membrane; extracellular space; nucleus
Biological process	B cell activation; B cell proliferation; humoral immune response; response to bacterium
Sources:Amigo / QuickGO
Orthologs
Databases	NCBI: entry; OMA: entry
Species	Human	Mouse
Entrez	931	12482
Ensembl	ENSG00000156738	ENSMUSG00000024673
UniProt	P11836	P19437
RefSeq (mRNA)	NM_152866; NM_021950; NM_152867	NM_007641
RefSeq (protein)	NP_068769; NP_690605; NP_690606	NP_031667
Location (UCSC)	Chr 11: 60.46 – 60.47 Mb	Chr 19: 11.23 – 11.24 Mb
PubMed search
- Wikidata
View/Edit Human	View/Edit Mouse

B-lymphocyte antigen CD20 or CD20 is B lymphocyte cell-surface molecule.

It is a 33-37 kDa non-glycosylated protein. CD20 is expressed on the surface of B-cells from the pre-B phase, the expression is lost in terminally differentiated plasma cells.

CD20 is used as a therapeutical target of B-cell malignancies and autoimmune diseases.

== Gene ==
In humans CD20 is encoded by the MS4A1 gene localized to 11q12.

The gene is 16 kbp long and consists of 8 exons. There are at least 3 mRNA transcripts (resulting from alternative splicing), that are all translated into an identical full-length CD20 protein product. Variants 1 and 2 are poorly translated due to inhibitory upstream open reading frames and stem-loop structures within their 5' untranslated regions. The relative abundance of translation-competent variant 3, as opposed to the poorly translated variants 1 and 2, may be a key determinant of CD20 levels in normal and malignant human B cells and their responses to CD20-directed immunotherapies.

MS4A1 gene is a member of the membrane-spanning 4A gene family. Members of this nascent protein family are characterized by common structural features and similar intron/exon splice boundaries and display unique expression patterns among hematopoietic cells and non-lymphoid tissues.

== Structure ==
CD20 is a transmembrane protein consisting of four hydrophobic transmembrane domains, one intracellular domain and two extracellular loops. There are three different forms of CD20 according to variable phosphorylation.

CD20 is located on the cell surface as homo-dimeric and homo-tetrameric oligomers. It is associated with other cell-surface and cytoplasmic proteins connected to the signal transduction (CD53, CD81, CD82).

CD20 is also known to be physically coupled to major histocompatibility complex class II (MHCII), CD40 and B-cell receptor (BCR).

== Function ==
The biological function of CD20 as well as its natural ligand is not fully elucidated.

CD20 deletion in mice does not impair B-cell differentiation, isotype switch, maturation, proliferation or tissue localization. However, CD20^{−/−} mice show decreased humoral immunity responses in both T-cell dependent and T-cell independent manner.

Functional studies suggest that CD20 molecule is required for efficient BCR signaling. It possibly acts as a calcium channel (CD20 has structural similarities with some known ion channels) or is directly connected to calcium flux.

It is not fully understood, if other molecular pathways or B and T-cell interactions might be affected by CD20 levels on the B-cell surface. The interleukin 4 (IL-4) produced by T cells can induce CD20 expression via STAT6 transcription factor.

== Expression ==
CD20 is expressed on all stages of B cell development from pre-B cells in the bone-marrow through immature, naive, mature and memory cells in lymphoid tissues and blood. The expression is lost on plasma blasts and plasma cells.

CD20 is a marker of B cell malignancies. It is found on B-cell lymphomas, hairy cell leukemia, B-cell chronic lymphocytic leukemia, and melanoma cancer stem cells.

Immunohistochemistry can be used to determine the presence of CD20 on cells in histological tissue sections. Because CD20 remains present on the cells of most B-cell neoplasms, and is absent on otherwise similar appearing T-cell neoplasms, it can be very useful in diagnosing conditions such as B-cell lymphomas and leukaemias.

However, the presence or absence of CD20 in such tumours is not relevant to prognosis, with the progression of the disease being much the same in either case. CD20 positive cells are also sometimes found in cases of Hodgkins disease, myeloma, and thymoma.

Even though B cells represent the majority of CD20+ cells, a subset of CD3+ T cells also expresses CD20. CD20+ T cells are mostly CD8+ effector memory T cells with proinflammatory features. Further work is needed to understand the contribution of these cells to immune responses.

== Anti-CD20 monoclonal antibodies ==
The targeting of CD20 molecule is highly effective way to deplete B-cell populations. Thus, anti-CD20 monoclonal antibodies (mAbs) play a crucial role in the management of B cell malignancies as well as some inflammatory and autoimmune diseases. The first anti-CD20 mAb approved by FDA in 1997 was Rituximab, defining a new epoch in hematooncology.

The advantages of CD20 as a therapeutic target are:

- conserved expression CD20 is expressed on the surface of virtually all mature B-cells. The expression on malignous B-cells is also relatively constant.
- limited off-target toxicity Anti-CD20 therapy does not affect hematopoietic stem cells and plasma cells, since they do not express CD20. It is important for B-cell repopulation following the therapy and retaining humoral protection against previously encountered pathogens via plasma cells, respectively.
- epitope stability The extracellular loops of CD20 are conserved sequences and undergo only a little post-translational modifications. It provides stable and predictable binding epitopes for mAbs.

=== Mechanism ===
Mechanism of action of anti-CD20 effects include:

- Complement dependent cytotoxicity Anti-CD20 mAbs interact with C1q complement protein, leading to classical complement pathway activation and eventual complement dependent cytotoxicity.
- Fcγ receptor mediated effects Fcγ receptors expressed on neutrophils, NK cells or macrophages interact with Fc part of anti-CD20 mAb. The interaction leads to enhanced cytotoxic activity of NK cells (antibody-dependent cell-mediated cytotoxicity) and phagocytosis by macrophages and neutrophils (antibody-dependent cell-mediated phagocytosis).
- Hyper-crosslinking The accumulation of anti-CD20 mAbs on the cell surface may cause caspase-dependent apoptotic cell death.

=== In clinical practice ===
Examples of anti-CD20 mAbs and their approval status:

Generic name	Format	Indication	Approval status (FDA/EMA)
Rituximab	chimeric IgG1	NHL	1998/1997
Ibritumomab	mouse IgG1	NHL	2002/2004
Ofatumumab	human IgG1	CLL, MS	2009/2009
Obinutuzumab	humanized IgG1	CLL	2013/2014
Ocrelizumab	humanized IgG1	MS	2017/2018
Veltuzumab	humanized IgG1	NHL, CLL, ITP	clinical trials
Ublituximab	chimeric IgG1	CLL, MS	2022/2023
Ocaratuzumab	humanized IgG1	CLL	clinical trials

CD20 is the target of the mAbs rituximab, ocrelizumab, obinutuzumab, ofatumumab, ibritumomab tiuxetan, tositumomab, and ublituximab, which are all active agents in the treatment of all B cell lymphomas, leukemias, and B cell-mediated autoimmune diseases.

The anti-CD20 mAB ofatumumab (Genmab) was approved by FDA in October 2009 for chronic lymphocytic leukemia.

The anti-CD20 mAB obinutuzumab (Gazyva) was approved by FDA in November 2013 for chronic lymphocytic leukemia.

Ocrelizumab was approved by the FDA in March 2017 for multiple sclerosis as the first treatment of the primary progressive form of MS. Clinical trials in rheumatoid arthritis and systemic lupus erythematosus were discontinued in 2010 due to an infection related safety risk.

Although phase II trials for the use of Rituximab in myalgic encephalomyelitis showed promising results, these could not be replicated in a large randomized controlled trial and preliminary results from a Phase III trial were negative.

Additional anti-CD20 antibody therapeutics under development (phase II or III clinical trials in 2008) include :

- Obinutuzumab for systemic lupus erythematosus,
- Ocaratuzumab for follicular lymphoma and rheumatoid arthritis,
- TRU-015 (by Trubion), (discontinued in 2010)
- IMMU-106 (veltuzumab). for non-Hodgkin's lymphoma or (2015) immune thrombocytopenia.

== Clinical significance ==
=== Diabetes mellitus ===
A link between the immune system's B cells and diabetes mellitus has been determined.

In cases of obesity, the presence of fatty tissues surrounding the body's major organ systems results in cell necrosis and insulin insensitivity along the boundary between them. Eventually, the contents of fat cells that would otherwise have been digested by insulin are shed into the bloodstream. An inflammation response that mobilizes both T and B cells results in the creation of antibodies against these cells, causing them to become less responsive to insulin by an as-yet-unknown mechanism and promoting hypertension, hypertriglyceridemia, and arteriosclerosis, hallmarks of the metabolic syndrome.

Obese mice administered anti-B cell CD-20 antibodies, however, did not become less responsive to insulin and as a result, did not develop diabetes mellitus or the metabolic syndrome, the posited mechanism being that anti-CD20 antibodies rendered the T cell antibodies dysfunctional and therefore powerless to cause insulin insensitivity by a B cell antibody-modulated autoimmune response. The protection afforded by anti-CD-20 lasted approximately forty days—the time it takes the body to replenish its supply of B cells—after which repetition was necessary to restore it. Hence, it has been argued that diabetes mellitus be reclassified as an autoimmune disease rather than a purely metabolic one and focus treatment for it on immune system modulation.
