= Corixa (company) =

U.S. biotechnology/pharmaceutical company

Coordinates: 47.615976°N 122.334242°W

- Company type: biotechnology/pharmaceutical
- Founded: 1994 in Seattle, Washington
- Defunct: March 31, 2006
- Successor: acquired by GlaxoSmithKline
- Headquarters: Seattle, Washington
- Number of locations: 2
- Parent: GlaxoSmithKline (United States)

Corixa was a biotechnology/pharmaceutical company based in Seattle, Washington, involved in the development of immunotherapeutics to combat autoimmune diseases, infectious diseases, and cancer. It was founded in 1994. It operated a laboratory and production facility in Hamilton, Montana.

In 2005, the European pharmaceuticals giant GlaxoSmithKline completed the acquisition of Corixa. GSK had formerly made use of the Corixa's MPL (Monophosphoryl lipid A, a derivative of the lipid A molecule), an adjuvant in some of their vaccines.
