= Primary cutaneous marginal zone lymphoma =

- Specialty: Dermatology/oncology

Primary cutaneous marginal zone lymphomas represent a heterogeneous group of diseases characterized by solitary or multiple dermal or subcutaneous nodules. Lymphomas included in this group are:

- Primary cutaneous immunocytoma
- Marginal zone B-cell lymphoma
- Mucosa-associated lymphoid tissue lymphoma

== See also ==
- Cutaneous B-cell lymphoma
- Skin lesion
