= Cutaneous lymphoma =

- Specialty: Dermatology/oncology

Several types of Primary Cutaneous B-Cell Lymphomas

Cutaneous lymphoma, also known as lymphoma cutis, is when lymphoma involves the skin. It is characterized by a proliferation of lymphoid tissue.

There are two main classes of lymphomas that affect the skin:

- Cutaneous T-cell lymphoma
- Cutaneous B-cell lymphoma
