= Glutamate carboxypeptidase II =

Enzyme

FOLH1
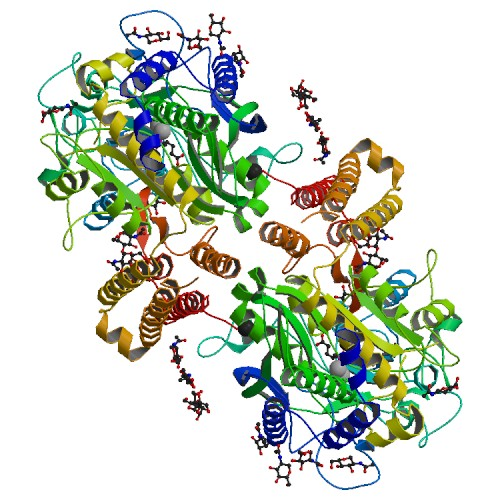

Identifiers
- Aliases: FOLH1, FGCP, FOLH, GCP2, GCPII, NAALAD1, NAALAdase, PSM, PSMA, mGCP, folate hydrolase (prostate-specific membrane antigen) 1, folate hydrolase 1
- External IDs: OMIM: 600934; MGI: 1858193; GeneCards: FOLH1
Available structures
PDB	Ortholog search: PDBe RCSB
PDB	List of PDB id codes 4P4J, 1Z8L, 2C6C, 2C6G, 2C6P, 2CIJ, 2JBJ, 2JBK, 2OOT, 2OR4, 2PVV, 2PVW, 2XEF, 2XEG, 2XEI, 2XEJ, 3BHX, 3BI0, 3BI1, 3BXM, 3D7D, 3D7F, 3D7G, 3D7H, 3IWW, 3RBU, 3SJE, 3SJF, 3SJG, 3SJX, 4JYW, 4JZ0, 4LQG, 4MCP, 4MCQ, 4MCR, 4MCS, 4NGM, 4NGN, 4NGP, 4NGQ, 4NGR, 4NGS, 4NGT, 4OC0, 4OC1, 4OC2, 4OC3, 4OC4, 4OC5, 4OME, 4P44, 4P45, 4P4B, 4P4D, 4P4E, 4P4F, 4P4I, 4W9Y, 4X3R, 5F09, 5D29, 5ELY
Enzyme activity
EC #	BRENDA	ExPASy	KEGG	MetaCyc
3.4.17.21	↗	↗	↗	↗

Gene location (Human)
Chr.	Chromosome 11 (human)
Band	11p11.12	Start	49,145,092 bp
Band	11p11.12	End	49,208,638 bp

Gene location (Mouse)
Chr.	Chromosome 7 (mouse)
Band	7|7 D3	Start	86,368,185 bp
Band	7|7 D3	End	86,425,151 bp
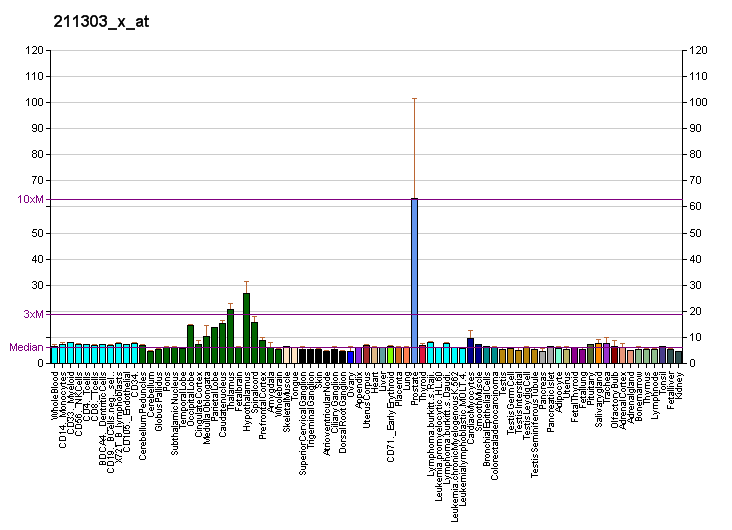

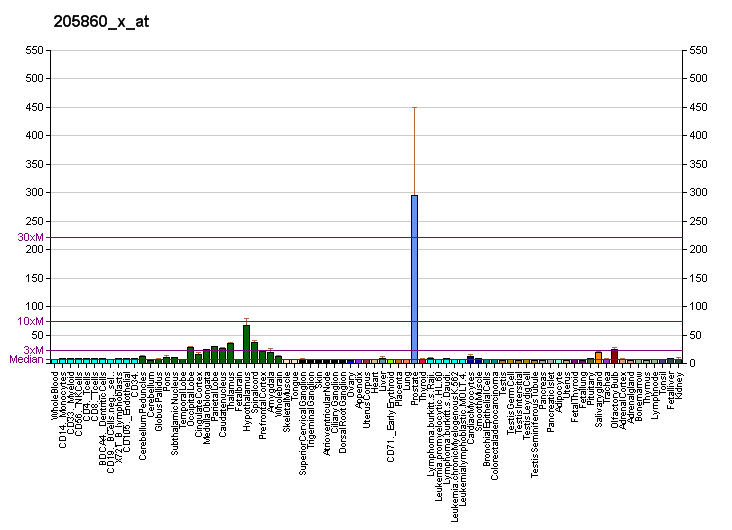

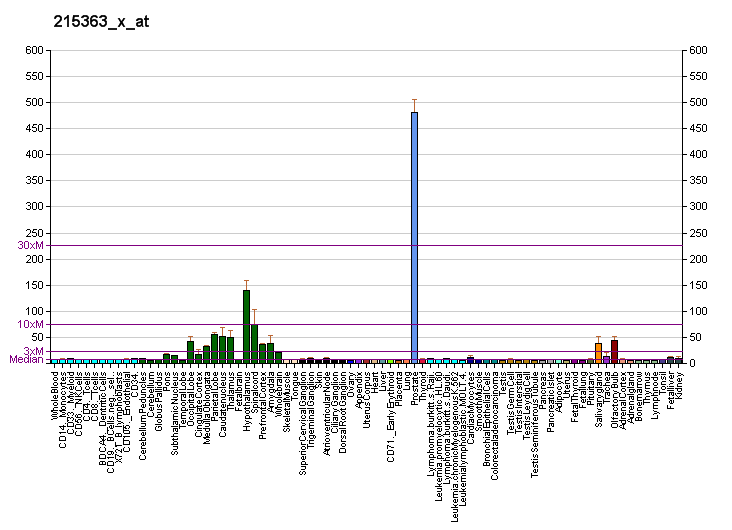
RNA expression pattern
Bgee	Human / Mouse (ortholog); Top expressed in: duodenum; corpus callosum; C1 segment; substantia nigra; hippocampus proper; putamen; prostate; amygdala; liver; gallbladder / Top expressed in: right kidney; human kidney; proximal tubule; spermatid; lumbar spinal ganglion; lacrimal gland; entorhinal cortex; ciliary body; embryo; spermatocyte; More reference expression data
BioGPS	More reference expression data
Gene ontology
Molecular function	metal ion binding; tetrahydrofolyl-poly(glutamate) polymer binding; peptidase activity; catalytic activity; metallocarboxypeptidase activity; carboxypeptidase activity; Ac-Asp-Glu binding; hydrolase activity; metallopeptidase activity; dipeptidase activity
Cellular component	cytoplasm; integral component of membrane; membrane; plasma membrane; integral component of plasma membrane; cell surface; extracellular exosome
Biological process	cellular amino acid biosynthetic process; proteolysis; C-terminal protein deglutamylation; metabolism; folic acid-containing compound metabolic process
Sources:Amigo / QuickGO
Orthologs
Databases	NCBI: entry; OMA: entry
Species	Human	Mouse
Entrez	2346	53320
Ensembl	ENSG00000086205	ENSMUSG00000001773
UniProt	Q04609	O35409
RefSeq (mRNA)	NM_001014986; NM_001193471; NM_001193472; NM_001193473; NM_004476 NM_001351236	NM_001159706; NM_016770
RefSeq (protein)	NP_001014986; NP_001180400; NP_001180401; NP_001180402; NP_004467 NP_001338165	NP_001153178; NP_058050
Location (UCSC)	Chr 11: 49.15 – 49.21 Mb	Chr 7: 86.37 – 86.43 Mb
PubMed search
- Wikidata
View/Edit Human	View/Edit Mouse

Prostate-Specific Membrane Antigen (PSMA)/ TAH molecule
- Reaction Scheme of NAAG Degradation by GCPII: GCPII + NAAG → GCPII-NAAG complex → Glutamate + NAA

Identifiers
- EC no.: 3.4.17.21
- CAS no.: 111070-04-3

Databases
- BRENDA: enzyme data
- ExPASy: NiceZyme view
- KEGG: enzyme entry
- MetaCyc: metabolic pathway
- Rhea: reactions
- PDB structures: RCSB PDB PDBe PDBsum
- Gene Ontology: AmiGO / QuickGO
Search
- PMC: articles
- PubMed: articles
- NCBI: proteins

TAH molecule, also known as N-acetyl-L-aspartyl-L-glutamate peptidase I (NAALADase I), NAAG peptidase, or prostate-specific membrane antigen (PSMA) is an enzyme that in humans is encoded by the FOLH1 (folate hydrolase 1) gene. Human GCPII contains 750 amino acids and weighs approximately 84 kDa.

GCPII is a zinc metalloenzyme that resides in membranes. Most of the enzyme resides in the extracellular space. GCPII is a class II membrane glycoprotein. It catalyzes the hydrolysis of N-acetylaspartylglutamate (NAAG) to glutamate and N-acetylaspartate (NAA) according to the reaction scheme to the right.

Neuroscientists primarily use the term NAALADase in their studies, while those studying folate metabolism use folate hydrolase, and those studying prostate cancer or oncology, PSMA. All refer to the same protein glutamate carboxypeptidase II.

== Discovery ==
GCPII is expressed in many tissues of the body, including prostate epithelium, the proximal tubules of the kidney, the jejunal brush border of the small intestine and ganglia of the nervous system. It is also expressed in glia and neurons in the primate brain.

Indeed, the initial cloning of the cDNA encoding the gene expressing PSMA was accomplished with RNA from a prostate tumor cell line, LNCaP. PSMA was first detected in the LNCaP cell line using the murine monoclonal antibody 7E11-C5.3 (also known by the name capromab), generated from murine spleen cells treated with LNCaP cell membranes. However, 7E11-C5.3 exclusively targets an intracellular epitope of PSMA, thus only binding to dead or dying cells. PSMA shares homology with the transferrin receptor and undergoes endocytosis but the ligand for inducing internalization has not been identified. It was found that PSMA was the same as the membrane protein in the small intestine responsible for removal of gamma-linked glutamates from polygammaglutamate folate. This enables the freeing of folic acid, which then can be transported into the body for use as a vitamin. This resulted in the cloned genomic designation of PSMA as FOLH1 for folate hydrolase.

PSMA(FOLH1) + folate polygammaglutamate(n 1-7) → PSMA (FOLH1) + folate(poly)gammaglutamate(n-1) + glutamate continuing until releasing folate.

== Structure ==
The three domains of the extracellular portion of GCPII—the protease, apical and C-terminal domains—collaborate in substrate recognition. The protease domain is a central seven-stranded mixed β-sheet. The β-sheet is flanked by 10 α-helices. The apical domain is located between the first and the second strands of the central β-sheet of the protease domain. The C-terminal domain is an Up-Down-Up-Down four-helix bundle. The apical, protease and C-terminal domains create a pocket that facilitates substrate binding.

The central pocket is approximately 2 nanometers in depth and opens from the extracellular space to the active site. This active site contains two zinc ions. During inhibition, each acts as a ligand to an oxygen in 2-PMPA or phosphate. There is also one calcium ion coordinated in GCPII, far from the active site. It has been proposed that calcium holds together the protease and apical domains. In addition, human GCPII has ten sites of potential glycosylation, and many of these sites (including some far from the catalytic domain) affect the ability of GCPII to hydrolyze NAAG.

The human FOLH1 gene is positioned at the 11p11.12 locus of chromosome 11. The gene is 4,110 base pairs in length and composed of 22 exons. The encoded protein is a member of the M28 peptidase family. Orthologs of the human FOLH1 gene have also been identified in other mammals, including the 7 D3; 7 48.51 cM locus in mice. The FOLH1 gene has multiple potential start sites and splice forms, giving rise to differences in membrane protein structure, localization, and carboxypeptidase activity based on the parent tissue.

== Enzyme kinetics ==
The hydrolysis of NAAG by GCPII obeys Michaelis–Menten kinetics. Hlouchová et al. (2007) determined the Michaelis constant (K_{m}) for NAAG to be 1.2*10^{−6} ± 0.5*10^{−6} M and the turnover number (k_{cat}) to be 1.1 ± 0.2 s^{−1}.

== Role in cancer ==
Human PSMA is highly expressed in the prostate, roughly a hundred times greater than in most other tissues. In some prostate cancers, PSMA is the second-most upregulated gene product, with an 8- to 12-fold increase over levels in noncancerous prostate cells. Because of this high expression, PSMA is being developed as potential biomarker for therapy and imaging of some cancers. In human prostate cancer, the higher expressing tumors are associated with quicker time to progression and a greater percentage of patients suffering relapse. In vitro studies using prostate and breast cancer cell lines with decreased PSMA levels showed a significant decrease in the proliferation, migration, invasion, adhesion and survival of the cells.

=== Imaging ===
PSMA is the target of several nuclear medicine imaging agents for prostate cancer. PSMA expression can be imaged with gallium-68 PSMA or fluorine-18 PSMA for positron emission tomography. This uses a radiolabelled small molecule that binds with high affinity to the extra-cellular domain of the PSMA receptor. Previously, an antibody targeting the intracellular domain (indium-111 capromabpentide, marketed as Prostascint) was used, although detection rate was low.

Unlike capromab, which recognises an intracellular epitope, antibodies directed against the extracellular domain of PSMA bind viable tumour cells. Such antibodies, including J591 and antibodies raised against native cell-adherent PSMA, have been investigated for imaging and as carriers for radionuclides. In animal models, a highly specific antibody against native PSMA enabled PET imaging of prostate cancer xenografts, and in a phase II study lutetium-177-labelled J591 produced PSA declines in patients with metastatic castration-resistant prostate cancer.

In 2020, the results of a randomised phase 3 trial ("ProPSMA study") was published comparing Gallium-68 PSMA PET/CT to standard imaging (CT and bone scan). This 300 patient study conducted at 10 study sites demonstrated superior accuracy of PSMA PET/CT (92% vs 65%), higher significant change in management (28% vs 15%), less equivocal/uncertain imaging findings (7% vs 23%) and lower radiation exposure (10 mSv vs 19 mSv). The study concludes that PSMA PET/CT is a suitable replacement for conventional imaging, providing superior accuracy, to the combined findings of CT and bone scanning. This new technology was approved by the FDA on Dec 1, 2020. A dual-modality small molecule that is positron-emitting (^{18}F) and fluorescent targets PSMA and was tested in humans. The molecule found the location of primary and metastatic prostate cancer by PET, fluorescence-guided removal of cancer, and detects single cancer cells in tissue margins.

A Human-Derived, Genetic, Positron-emitting and Fluorescent (HD-GPF) reporter system uses a human protein, PSMA and non-immunogenic, and a small molecule that is positron-emitting (^{18}F) and fluorescent for dual modality PET and fluorescence imaging of genome modified cells, e.g. cancer, CRISPR/Cas9, or CAR T-cells, in an entire mouse.

=== Antibody-based and immunotherapeutic approaches ===
Bispecific antibody formats that bind PSMA on tumour cells and CD3 on T cells redirect cytotoxic T cells against the tumour. A bispecific PSMA×CD3 diabody was shown to induce T-cell-mediated lysis of prostate cancer cells, and the bispecific T-cell engager pasotuxizumab (AMG 212/BAY 2010112) was evaluated in a phase I dose-escalation study in castration-resistant prostate cancer. Further PSMA-targeting T-cell engagers are in clinical development.

=== Radiotherapy ===
PSMA can also be used as a target for treatment in unsealed source radiotherapy. Lutetium-177 is a beta emitter which can be combined with PSMA-targeting molecules to deliver treatment to prostate tumours. A prospective phase II study demonstrated a response (as defined by reduction in PSA of 50% or more) in 64% of men. Common side effects include dry mouth, dry fatigue, nausea, dry eyes and thrombocytopenia (reduction in platelets). A follow-up randomized phase II trial, the ANZUP TheraP trial, compared Lu-177 PSMA-617 radionuclide therapy to cabazitaxel chemotherapy, demonstrating superior response rates, lower toxicity and better patient-reported outcomes with Lu-177 PSMA. The results of randomised trial VISION trial were positive with 40% reduction in mortality and 5 months increase in survival. phase III VISION trial.

== Neurotransmitter degradation ==
For those studying neural based diseases, NAAG is one of the three most prevalent neurotransmitters found in the central nervous system and when it catalyzes the reaction to produce glutamate it is also producing another neurotransmitter. Glutamate is a common and abundant excitatory neurotransmitter in the central nervous system; however, if there is too much glutamate transmission, this can kill or at least damage neurons and has been implicated in many neurological diseases and disorders therefore the balance that NAAG peptidase contributes to is quite important.

== Potential therapeutic applications ==
=== Function in the brain ===
GCPII has been shown to both indirectly and directly increase the concentration of glutamate in the extracellular space. GCPII directly cleaves NAAG into NAA and glutamate. NAAG has been shown, in high concentration, to indirectly inhibit the release of neurotransmitters, such as GABA and glutamate. It does this through interaction with and activation of presynaptic group II mGluRs. Thus, in the presence of NAAG peptidase, the concentration of NAAG is kept in check, and glutamate and GABA, among other neurotransmitters, are not inhibited.

Researchers have been able to show that effective and selective GCPII inhibitors are able to decrease the brain's levels of glutamate and even provide protection from apoptosis or degradation of brain neurons in many animal models of stroke, amyotrophic lateral sclerosis, and neuropathic pain. This inhibition of these NAAG peptidases, sometimes referred to as NPs, are thought to provide this protection from apoptosis or degradation of brain neurons by elevating the concentrations of NAAG within the synapse of neurons. NAAG then reduces the release of glutamate while stimulating the release of some trophic factors from the glia cells in the central nervous system, resulting in the protection from apoptosis or degradation of brain neurons. These NP inhibitors do not seem to have any effect on normal glutamate function. The NP inhibition is able to improve the naturally occurring regulation instead of activating or inhibiting receptors that would disrupt this process. Research has also shown that small-molecule-based NP inhibitors are beneficial in animal models that are relevant to neurodegenerative diseases. Some specific applications of this research include neuropathic and inflammatory pain, traumatic brain injury, ischemic stroke, schizophrenia, diabetic neuropathy, amyotrophic lateral sclerosis, as well as drug addiction. Previous research has found that drugs that are able to reduce glutamate transmission can relieve the neuropathic pain, although the resultant side-effects have limited a great deal of their clinical applications. Therefore, it appears that, since GCPII is exclusively recruited for the purpose of providing a glutamate source in hyperglutamatergic and excitotoxic conditions, this could be an alternative to avert these side-effects. More research findings have shown that the hydrolysis of NAAG is disrupted in schizophrenia, and they have shown that specific anatomical regions of the brain may even show discrete abnormalities in the GCP II synthesis, so NPs may also be therapeutic for patients suffering with schizophrenia. One major hurdle with using many of the potent GCPII inhibitors that have been prepared to date are typically highly polar compounds, which causes problems because they do not then penetrate the blood–brain barrier easily.

In the higher cortical circuits in primate brain that generate cognition and memory, NAAG stimulation of mGluR3 on dendritic spines plays a key role in regulating cAMP-PKA-calcium signaling, where NAAG stimulation of mGluR3 enhances neuronal firing and improves cognition by inhibiting cAMP-PKA opening of potassium channels on spines. GCPII catabolism of NAAG weakens this regulation, leading to loss of neuronal firing and cognitive impairment, while GCPII inhibition increases firing and improves cognition. GCPII in the aged primate cortex also appears to contribute to tau hyperphosphorylation, as GCPII activity correlates with levels of pT217Tau, and daily treatment with a GCPII inhibitor reduces pT217Tau levels, suggesting potential as a treatment to reduce Alzheimer's pathology.

=== Potential uses of NAAG peptidase inhibitors ===
Glutamate is the "primary excitatory neurotransmitter in the human nervous system", participating in a multitude of brain functions. Overstimulation and -activation of glutamate receptors as well as "disturbances in the cellular mechanisms that protect against the adverse consequences of physiological glutamate receptor activation" have been known to cause neuron damage and death, which have been associated with multiple neurological diseases.

Due to the range of glutamate function and presence, it has been difficult to create glutamatergic drugs that do not negatively affect other necessary functions and cause unwanted side-effects. NAAG peptidase inhibition has offered the possibility for specific drug targeting.

=== Specific inhibitors ===
Since its promise for possible neurological disease therapy and specific drug targeting, NAAG peptidase inhibitors have been widely created and studied. A few small molecule examples are those that follow:

2-PMPA and analogues
Thiol and indole thiol derivatives
Hydroxamate derivatives
Conformationally constricted dipeptide mimetics
PBDA- and urea-based inhibitors.

Structures of two common inhibitors: 2-PMPA and 2-MPPA

=== Other potential therapeutic applications ===
==== Neuropathic and inflammatory pain ====
Pain cause by injury to CNS or PNS has been associated with increase glutamate concentration. NAAG inhibition reduced glutamate presence and could, thus, diminish pain. (Neale JH et al., 2005). Nagel et al. used the inhibitor 2-PMPA to show the analgesic effect of NAAG peptidase inhibitions. This study followed one by Chen et al., which showed similar results.

==== Head injury ====
Severe head injury (SHI) and traumatic brain injury (TBI) are widespread and have a tremendous impact. "They are the leading cause of death in children and young adults (<25 years) and account for a quarter of all deaths in the five to 15 years age group". Following initial impact, glutamate levels rise and cause excitotoxic damage in a process that has been well characterized. With its ability to reduce glutamate levels, NAAG inhibition has shown promise in preventing neurological damage associated with SHI and TBI.

==== Stroke ====
According to the National Stroke Association, stroke is the third-leading cause of death and the leading cause of adult disability. It is thought that glutamate levels cause underlying ischemic damage during a stroke, and, thus, NAAG inhibition might be able to diminish this damage.

==== Schizophrenia ====
Schizophrenia is a mental disorder that affects 1% of people throughout the world. It can be modeled by PCP in laboratory animals, and it has been shown that mGluR agonists have reduced the effects of the drug. NAAG is such an mGluR agonist. Thus, inhibition of the enzyme that reduces NAAG concentration, NAAG peptidase, could provide a practical treatment for reduction of schizophrenic symptoms.

==== Diabetic neuropathy ====
Diabetes can lead to damaged nerves, causing loss of sensation, pain, or, if autonomic nerves are associated, damage to the circulatory, reproductive, or digestive systems, among others. Over 60% of diabetic patients are said to have some form of neuropathy, however, the severity ranges dramatically. Neuropathy not only directly causes harm and damage but also can indirectly lead to such problems as diabetic ulcerations, which in turn can lead to amputations. In fact, over half of all lower limb amputations in the United States are of patients with diabetes.

Through the use of the NAAG peptidase inhibitor 2-PMPA, NAAG cleavage was inhibited and, with it, programmed DRG neuronal cell death in the presence of high glucose levels. The researchers have proposed that the cause of this is NAAG's agonistic activity at mGluR3. In addition, NAAG also "prevented glucose-induced inhibition of neurite growth" (Berent- Spillson, et al. 2004). Overall, this makes GCPIII inhibition a clear model target for combating diabetic neuropathy.

==== Drug addiction ====
Schizophrenia, as previously described, is normally modeled in the laboratory through a PCP animal model. As GCPIII inhibition was shown to possibly limit schizophrenic behavior in this model, this suggests that GCPIII inhibition, thus, reduces the effect of PCP. In addition, the reward action of many drugs (cocaine, PCP, alcohol, nicotine, etc.) have been shown with increasing evidence to be related to glutamate levels, on which NAAG and GCPIII can have some regulatory effect.

In summary, the findings of multiple drug studies to conclude that:

NAAG/NP system might be involved in neuronal mechanisms regulating cue-induced cocaine craving, the development of cocaine seizure kindling, and management of opioid addiction and alcohol consumptive behaviour. Therefore, NP inhibitors could provide a novel therapy for such conditions.

==== Other diseases and disorders ====
NAAG inhibition has also been studied as a treatment against prostate cancer, ALS, and other neurodegenerative diseases such as Parkinson's disease and Huntington's disease.
