= Oprozomib =

Chemical compound

Clinical data
- Pronunciation: /oʊˈprɒzoʊmɪb/ oh-PROZ-oh-mib
- Other names: O-methyl-N-(2-methyl-1,3-thiazol-5-carbonyl)-L-seryl-O-methyl-N-{(2S)-1-[(2R)-2-methyloxiran-2-yl]-1-oxo-3-phenylpropan-2-yl}-L-serinamide
- Routes of administration: Oral
- ATC code: None

Legal status
- Legal status: Investigational drug

Identifiers
- IUPAC name: N-[(2S)-3-methoxy-1-[[(2S)-3-methoxy-1-[[(2S)-1-[(2R)-2-methyloxiran-2-yl]-1-oxo-3-phenylpropan-2-yl]amino]-1-oxopropan-2-yl]amino]-1-oxopropan-2-yl]-2-methyl-1,3-thiazole-5-carboxamide
- CAS Number: 935888-69-0
- PubChem CID: 25067547
- IUPHAR/BPS: 8739
- ChemSpider: 28528375
- UNII: MZ37792Y8J
- KEGG: D10318
- ChEBI: CHEBI:747352
- ChEMBL: ChEMBL2103884
- CompTox Dashboard (EPA): DTXSID201025950

Chemical and physical data
- Formula: C_{25}H_{32}N_{4}O_{7}S
- Molar mass: 532.61 g·mol^{−1}
- 3D model (JSmol): Interactive image
- SMILES: COC[C@H](NC(=O)[C@H](COC)NC(=O)c1cnc(C)s1)C(=O)N[C@@H](Cc2ccccc2)C(=O)[C@@]3(C)CO3
- InChI: InChI=1S/C25H32N4O7S/c1-15-26-11-20(37-15)24(33)29-19(13-35-4)23(32)28-18(12-34-3)22(31)27-17(21(30)25(2)14-36-25)10-16-8-6-5-7-9-16/h5-9,11,17-19H,10,12-14H2,1-4H3,(H,27,31)(H,28,32)(H,29,33)/t17-,18-,19-,25+/m0/s1; Key:SWZXEVABPLUDIO-WSZYKNRRSA-N

Oprozomib (codenamed ONX 0912 and PR-047) is an orally active second-generation proteasome inhibitor developed by Proteolix, which was acquired by Onyx Pharmaceuticals, an Amgen subsidiary, in 2009. It selectively inhibits chymotrypsin-like activity of both the constitutive proteasome (PSMB5) and immunoproteasome (LMP7).

It is being investigated for the treatment of hematologic malignancies, specifically, multiple myeloma, with Phase 1b studies ongoing (as of February 16, 2016). Being an epoxyketone derivative, oprozomib is structurally related to carfilzomib and has the added benefit of being orally bioavailable. Like carfilzomib, it is active against bortezomib-resistant multiple myeloma cells.

Oprozomib was granted orphan drug status for the treatment of Waldenström's macroglobulinaemia and multiple myeloma in 2014.

== See also ==
- Ixazomib (trade name Ninlaro) — an orally available boronic acid-derived proteasome inhibitor approved for the treatment of multiple myeloma
