= Isatuximab =

Monoclonal antibody

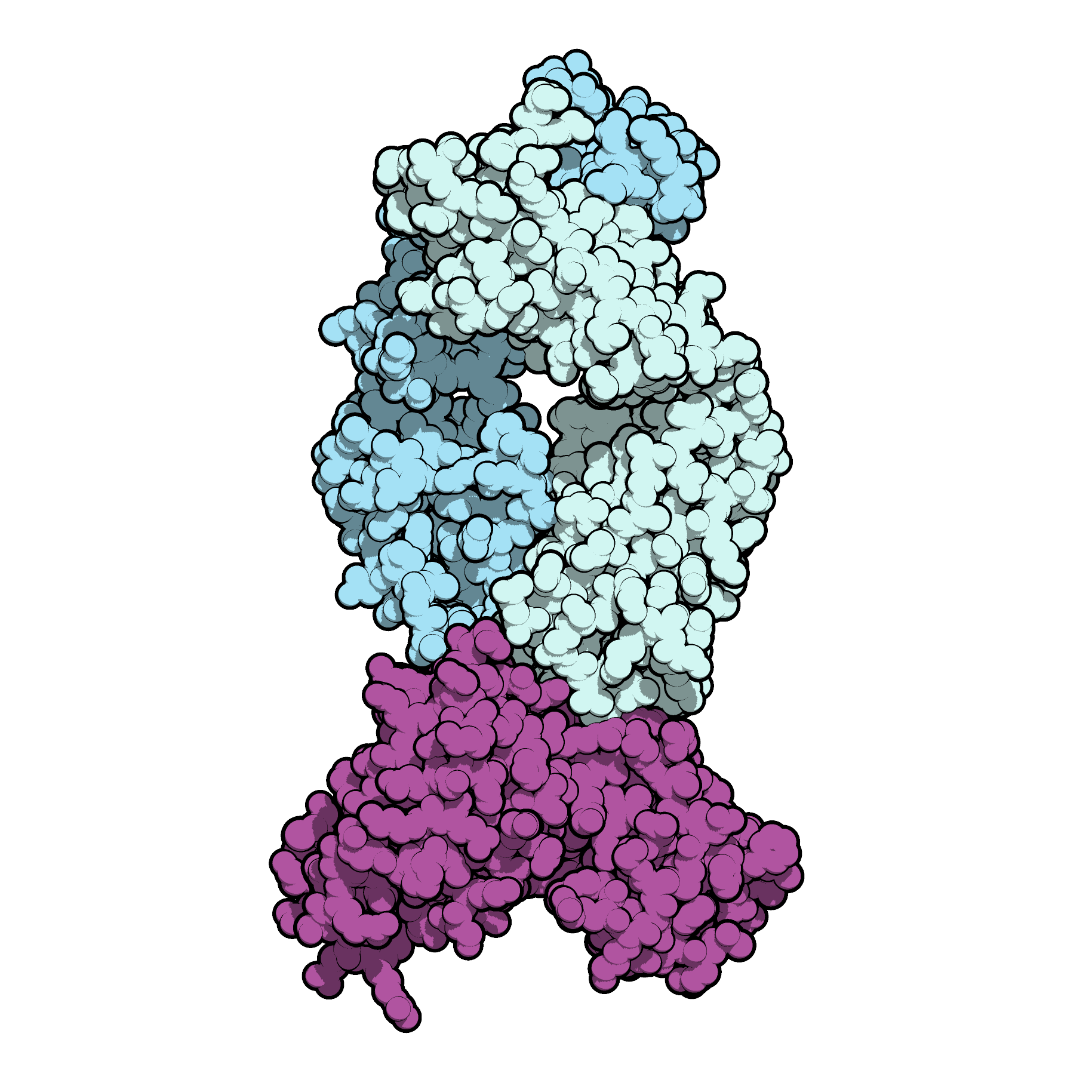
- Isatuximab (pale blue) binding CD38 (purple). PDB: 4CMH

Monoclonal antibody
- Type: Whole antibody
- Source: Chimeric (mouse/human)
- Target: CD38

Clinical data
- Trade names: Sarclisa, Sarclisa Escena
- Other names: SAR-650984, isatuximab-irfc
- AHFS/Drugs.com: Monograph
- MedlinePlus: a620023
- License data: US DailyMed: Sarclisa
- Pregnancy category: AU: C
- Routes of administration: Intravenous, subcutaneous
- Drug class: Antineoplastic
- ATC code: L01FC02 (WHO)

Legal status
- Legal status: AU: S4 (Prescription only); CA: ℞-only / Schedule D; US: ℞-only; EU: Rx-only

Identifiers
- CAS Number: 1461640-62-9
- DrugBank: DB14811
- ChemSpider: none
- UNII: R30772KCU0
- KEGG: D11050

Chemical and physical data
- Formula: C_{6456}H_{9932}N_{1700}O_{2026}S_{44}
- Molar mass: 145190.99 g·mol^{−1}

Isatuximab, sold under the brand name Sarclisa among others, is a monoclonal antibody medication used for the treatment of multiple myeloma. It is administered by either intravenous injection or subcutaneous injection. It is a CD38-directed cytolytic antibody.

The most common side effects include neutropenia (low levels of neutrophils, a type of white blood cell), infusion reactions, pneumonia (infection of the lungs), upper respiratory tract infection (such as nose and throat infections), diarrhea and bronchitis (inflammation of the airways in the lungs).

Isatuximab was approved for medical use in the United States and the European Union in 2020. The subcutaneous form was approved for medical use in the United States in June 2026.

== Medical uses ==
In the United States, isatuximab (intravenous) is indicated, in combination with pomalidomide and dexamethasone for the treatment of adults with multiple myeloma who have received at least two prior therapies including lenalidomide and a proteasome inhibitor; in combination with carfilzomib and dexamethasone, for the treatment of adults with relapsed or refractory multiple myeloma who have received one to three prior lines of therapy; or in combination with bortezomib, lenalidomide, and dexamethasone for the treatment of adults with newly diagnosed multiple myeloma who are not eligible for autologous stem cell transplant.

In the United States, isatuximab (subcutaneous) is indicated, in combination with pomalidomide and dexamethasone, for the treatment of adults with multiple myeloma who have received at least one prior line of therapy including lenalidomide and a proteasome inhibitor; in combination with carfilzomib and dexamethasone, for the treatment of adults with relapsed or refractory multiple myeloma who have received one to three prior lines of therapy; or in combination with bortezomib, lenalidomide and dexamethasone, for the treatment of adults with newly diagnosed multiple myeloma who are not eligible for autologous stem cell transplant.

In the European Union it is indicated, in combination with pomalidomide and dexamethasone, for the treatment of adults with relapsed and refractory multiple myeloma who have received at least two prior therapies including lenalidomide and a proteasome inhibitor and have demonstrated disease progression on the last therapy; in combination with carfilzomib and dexamethasone, for the treatment of adults with multiple myeloma who have received at least one prior therapy; in combination with bortezomib, lenalidomide, and dexamethasone, for the treatment of adults with newly diagnosed multiple myeloma who are ineligible for autologous stem cell transplant; or in combination with bortezomib, lenalidomide, and dexamethasone, for the induction treatment of adults with newly diagnosed multiple myeloma who are eligible for autologous stem cell transplant.

== Side effects ==
Adverse reactions to isatuximab may include neutropenia, infusion-related reactions and/or secondary primary malignancies. Of these three the most commonly occurring ones are the infusion-related reactions. Examples of the most frequent symptoms of infusion-related reactions are dyspnea, cough, chills, and nausea, while the severest signs and symptoms included hypertension and dyspnea.

== History ==
It was granted orphan drug designation for multiple myeloma by the European Medicines Agency in April 2014, and by the US Food and Drug Administration (FDA) in December 2016.

In March 2020, it was approved for medical use in the United States.

The U.S. Food and Drug Administration (FDA) approved isatuximab in March 2020, based on evidence from a clinical trial (NCT02990338) of 307 subjects with previously treated multiple myeloma. The trial was conducted at 102 sites in Europe, North America, Asia, Australia and New Zealand.

The trial evaluated the efficacy and side effects of isatuximab in subjects with previously treated multiple myeloma. Subjects were randomly assigned to receive either isatuximab (in combination with pomalidomide and low-dose dexamethasone) or active comparator (pomalidomide and low-dose dexamethasone). Treatment was administered in both groups in 28-day cycles until disease progression or unacceptable toxicity. Both subjects and health care providers knew which treatment was given. The trial measured the time patients lived without the cancer growing (progression-free survival or PFS).

It was approved for medical use in the European Union in May 2020.

== Structure and reactivity ==
The structure of isatuximab consists of two identical immunoglobulin kappa light chains and also two equal immunoglobulin gamma heavy chains. Chemically, isatuximab is similar to the structure and reactivity of daratumumab, hence both drugs show the same CD38 targeting. However, isatuximab shows a more potent inhibition of its ectozyme function. The latter gives potential for some non-cross reactivity. Isatuximab shows action of an allosteric antagonist with the inhibition of the CD38 enzymatic activity. Additionally, isatuximab shows potential where it can induce apoptosis without cross linking. Lastly, Isatuximab reveals direct killing activity when a larger increase in apoptosis is detected in CD38 expressing cancer cells. Furthermore, isatuximab demonstrated a dose dependent inhibition of CD38 enzymatic activity. However, daratumumab with the same experimental conditions shows a more limited inhibition without a dose response.

== Reactions ==
Isatuximab binds uniquely to an epitope on the CD38 receptor and is the only CD38 antibody which can start apoptosis directly. Isatuximab binds to a different CD38 epitope amino-acid sequence than does the anti-CD38 monoclonal antibody daratumumab. The binding with the CD38 receptor is mainly via the gamma heavy chains and are more potent than other CD38 antibodies such as daratumumab which can inhibit the enzymatic activity of CD38. Moreover, isatuximab inhibits the hydrolase activity of CD38.

The antibodies show signs of improving antitumor immunity by eliminating regulatory T cells, B cells and myeloid-derived suppressor cells. The difference in binding between isatuximab and daratumumab is in the recognition of the different amino acid groups. Isatuximab identifies 23 amino acids of CD38 to the contrary with daratumumab who has 27. The residue of Glu233 has a flexible sidechain and faces the N-terminal of Asp1 residue in the isatuximab light chain. The latter light chain of isatuximab is also flexible which makes the interaction between CD38/Glu233 and the Asp1 weaker than the other interactions between CD38 and isatuximab. The caspase-dependent apoptotic pathway and the lysosomal mediated cell death pathway in MM cells is induced by isatuximab. The MM cell death follows the downstream reactions of the lysosomal activation. The latter also activates the production of reactive oxygen species.

== Available forms ==
Isatuximab is available in an intravenous infusion form and in a subcutaneous form.

== Mechanism of action ==
Cancer of the blood that is distinguished by an overproduction of malignant plasma cells in the bone marrow is called multiple myeloma. The myeloma cells are marked with uniformed overexpression of CD38 surface glycoproteins. Although these proteins are also expressed on other myeloid and lymphoid cells, the extent is relatively minor compared to myeloma cells. The fact that CD38 glycoproteins carry out various important cellular functions, and that they are plentiful on the surface of myeloma cells, has made them an appealing target for multiple myeloma treatment. CD38 was first described as an activation marker, but later the molecule displayed functions in adhesion to endothelial CD31 proteins, e.g. as an aiding component of the synapse complex, as well as an ectoenzyme implicated in the metabolism of extracellular NAD+ and cytoplasmic NADP. The tumour cells can evade the immune system, possibly due to adenosine, an immunosuppressive molecule that arises as a product of the ectoenzymatic activity of CD38.

Isatuximab is an IgG1-derived monoclonal antibody that selectively binds to the CD38 that exists on the exterior of hematopoietic and multiple myeloma cells (as well as other tumor cells). This drug induces apoptosis of tumor cells and activates immune effector mechanisms such as complement dependent cytotoxicity (CDC), antibody-dependent cellular phagocytosis (ADCP), and antibody-dependent cell-mediated cytotoxicity (ADCC). Isatuximab is able to stimulate natural killer (NK) cells in the absence of CD38-positive target tumor cells and blocks CD38-positive T-regulatory cells. Furthermore, the NADase activity of CD38 is adjusted by isatuximab, similarly to other CD38 antibodies. Contrarily to daratumumab however, isatuximab can incite apoptosis directly without cross-linking, and in its binding epitope. According to the FDA, isatuximab alone has reduced ADCC and direct tumor cell killing activity in vitro in comparison to when it is combined with pomalidomide. As well as increased anti-tumor activity as opposed to isatuximab or pomalidomide only in a human multiple myeloma xenograft model.

In preclinical studies of B-cell malignancies, isatuximab demonstrated greater pro-apoptotic activity than daratumumab. It more effectively disrupted B-cell receptor signaling and inhibited the enzymatic activity of CD38. Structural analyses showed that isatuximab binding induced conformational changes in CD38 that impaired its enzymatic function, resulting in metabolic reprogramming and cell death. These findings support potential therapeutic applications for isatuximab beyond multiple myeloma, particularly in CD38-expressing B-cell malignancies.

== Metabolism and toxicity ==
=== Metabolism ===
Isatuximab is likely to be metabolized through catabolic pathways into smaller peptides. When isatuximab is at a constant state it is expected that the ≥99% elimination will occur approximately two months after the last dose was administered. The clearance percentage diminished when the dosages were increased over time, as well as when multiple doses were administered. However, the elimination of isatuximab did not differ when applied as a single agent or as a combination therapy.

=== Toxicity ===
A dose-limiting toxicity (DLT) has been characterized as the development of any of the following: grade ≥ 3 non-hematologic toxicity; grade 4 neutropenia or grade 4 thrombocytopenia lasting more than 5 days; grade ≥ 2 allergic reactions or hypersensitivity (i.e., infusion reactions); or any other toxicity considered to be dose-limiting by the investigators or sponsor. Grade ≤ 2 infusion reactions were excluded from the DLT definition, because, with suitable care, patients that had a grade 2 infusion reaction prior to completion of the infusion were able to finalize isatuximab administration.

There is no recommended reduced dose of isatuximab. In the eventuality of hematological toxicity it may be necessary to delay administration so that the blood count may be recovered. Although there is no counteracting agent for isatuximab, clinical experience with overdoses is seemingly nonexistent as well. Overdose symptoms will probably be in line with the side effects attached to isatuximab. Therefore, infusion reactions, gastrointestinal disturbances and an elevated risk of infections may occur. It is necessary to carefully monitor the patient in case of an overdose and to employ clinically indicated symptomatic and supportive procedures.

==== Pregnancy ====
When given to pregnant women isatuximab can cause fetal injury, due to the mechanism of action. It can precipitate depletion of immune cells as well as decreased bone density in the fetus. Pregnant women are therefore notified of the potential risks to a fetus, and women that are able to reproduce are advised to use effective contraceptives during treatment and at least five months subsequent to the last dose of isatuximab.

Furthermore, it is not recommended to combine isatuximab with pomalidomide in women that are carrying a child, because pomalidomide may cause birth defects and death of the unborn child.

== Efficacy ==
A phase III study of patients with refractory and relapsed MM, who were resistant to lenalidomide and a proteasome inhibitor, and could not have received daratumumab, another anti-CD38 monoclonal antibody was published in 2019 (ICARIA-MM). The addition of isatuximab to pomalidomide and dexamethasone improved progression free survival to 11.5 months compared to 6.5 months, with an overall response rate of 63%.

== Names ==
Isatuximab is the international nonproprietary name and the United States Adopted Name (USAN).
