= MG132 =

Names
- Systematic IUPAC name Benzyl [(2S)-4-methyl-1-{[(2S)-4-methyl-1-{[(2S)-4-methyl-1-oxopentan-2-yl]amino}-1-oxopentan-2-yl]amino}-1-oxopentan-2-yl]carbamate
- Other names N-Benzyloxycarbonyl-L-leucyl-L-leucyl-L-leucinal; Z-Leu-Leu-Leu-al

Identifiers
CAS Number	133407-82-6
3D model (JSmol)	Interactive image
ChemSpider	406728
PubChem CID	462382
UNII	RF1P63GW3K
CompTox Dashboard (EPA)	DTXSID3042639
- InChI: InChI=1S/C26H41N3O5/c1-17(2)12-21(15-30)27-24(31)22(13-18(3)4)28-25(32)23(14-19(5)6)29-26(33)34-16-20-10-8-7-9-11-20/h7-11,15,17-19,21-23H,12-14,16H2,1-6H3,(H,27,31)(H,28,32)(H,29,33)/t21-,22-,23-/m0/s1 Key: TZYWCYJVHRLUCT-VABKMULXSA-N
- SMILES: CC(C)C[C@@H](C=O)NC(=O)[C@H](CC(C)C)NC(=O)[C@H](CC(C)C)NC(=O)OCc1ccccc1

Properties
Chemical formula	C_{26}H_{41}N_{3}O_{5}
Molar mass	475.630 g·mol^{−1}
Appearance	White solid
Solubility	100 mM in EtOH and DMSO
- Except where otherwise noted, data are given for materials in their standard state (at 25 °C [77 °F], 100 kPa). verify (what is ?) Infobox references

MG132 is a potent, reversible, and cell-permeable proteasome inhibitor (K_{i} = 4 nM). It belongs to the class of synthetic peptide aldehydes. It reduces the degradation of ubiquitin-conjugated proteins in mammalian cells and permeable strains of yeast by the 26S complex without affecting its ATPase or isopeptidase activities. MG132 activates c-Jun N-terminal kinase (JNK1), which initiates apoptosis. MG132 also inhibits NF-κB activation with an IC_{50} of 3 μM and prevents β-secretase cleavage.

== Molecular mechanism ==
There are several inhibitors that can readily enter cell and selectively inhibit degradative pathway. It includes peptide aldehydes, such as Cbz-leu-leu-leucinal (MG132), Cbz-leu-leu-norvalinal (MG115) and acetyl-leu-leu-norleucinal (ALLN). These are substrate analogues and potent transition-state inhibitors of chymotrypsin like activity of proteasome machinery. The peptide aldehydes are also known to inhibit certain lysosomal cysteine proteases and the calpains hence MG132 may not be exclusive inhibitor of proteasomal pathway.
