= Proteasome inhibitor =

Drug

Chemical structure of bortezomib, the first proteasome inhibitor approved for use.

Proteasome inhibitors (INN stem –zomib) are drugs that block the action of proteasomes. Proteasomes are large proteins complexes that are used to break down other proteins. These inhibitors are being studied for the treatment of cancer. Drugs such as bortezomib, carfilzomib, and ixazomib are already approved for use in treating multiple myeloma and mantle cell lymphoma. They also work as immunosuppressants and inhibit bone resorption.

Proteasome inhibitors are most commonly categorized into two different groups; Synthetic Analogs and Natural products. Synthetic inhibitors are compounds that are all peptide based such as peptide... benzamides, alpha-ketoamides, aldehydes, alpha-ketoaldehydes, vinyl sulfones, and boronic acids. The Natural product inhibitors do not have all of the same core structures and pharmacophores, these natural products are just as selective and potent as the synthetic inhibitors for example lactacystin. Lactacystin is a natural proteasome inhibitors, that was discovered because of its ability to inhibit the cell lines progression, by targeting the 20S proteasome. Another example of a natural inhibitor would be PI31, it natural occurs in the human body and is used to maintain proteostasis.

== Mechanism ==
This is a chemical structure of Carfilzomib. A known proteasome inhibitor, now used in cancer treatment.

The most common hypothesis is that when the proteasome is inhibited, it causes a buildup of proteins in the cell, creating a toxic environment that leads to cell death. The most common proteasome inhibitors block the proteasome-ubiquitin pathway by directly targeting the 20S proteasome itself, rather than inhibiting the ubiquitination of proteins, or the identification of these substrates

Multiple mechanisms are likely to be involved, but proteasome inhibition may prevent degradation of pro-apoptotic factors such as the p53 protein, permitting activation of programmed cell death in neoplastic cells dependent upon suppression of pro-apoptotic pathways. For example, bortezomib causes a rapid and dramatic change in the levels of intracellular peptides.

== Examples ==
- The first non-peptidic proteasome inhibitor discovered was the natural product lactacystin.
  The chemical structure of Ixazomib, now commonly used as a treatment for cancer.
- Disulfiram has been proposed as another proteasome inhibitor.
- Epigallocatechin-3-gallate has also been proposed.
- Marizomib (salinosporamide A) has started clinical trials for multiple myeloma.
- Oprozomib (ONX-0912), delanzomib (CEP-18770) have also started clinical trials.
- Epoxomicin is a naturally occurring selective inhibitor.
- MG132 is a synthesized peptide commonly used for in vitro studies.
- Beta-hydroxy beta-methylbutyrate is a proteasome inhibitor in human skeletal muscle in vivo.
- PI31 acts as a 20S proteasome inhibitor used for proteostasis that occurs naturally in the human body.

== Approved medications ==
- Bortezomib (Velcade) was approved in 2003. This was the first proteasome inhibitor approved for use in the U.S. Its boron atom binds the catalytic site of the 26S proteasome.
- Carfilzomib (Kyprolis) was approved by the FDA for relapsed and refractory multiple myeloma in 2012 . It irreversibly binds to and inhibits the chymotrypsin-like activity of the 20S proteasome.
- Ixazomib (Ninlaro) was approved by the FDA in 2015 for use in combination with lenalidomide and dexamethasone for the treatment of multiple myeloma after at least one prior therapy. It is the first orally-available proteasome inhibitor
