= Polycomb-group proteins =

Family of proteins that play a role in chromatin remodeling

Polycomb-group proteins (PcG proteins) are a family of protein complexes first discovered in fruit flies that can remodel chromatin such that epigenetic silencing of genes takes place. Polycomb-group proteins are well known for silencing Hox genes through modulation of chromatin structure during embryonic development in fruit flies (Drosophila melanogaster). They derive their name from the fact that the first sign of a decrease in PcG function is often a homeotic transformation of posterior legs towards anterior legs, which have a characteristic comb-like set of bristles.

== In insects ==
In Drosophila, the Trithorax-group (trxG) and Polycomb-group (PcG) proteins act antagonistically and interact with chromosomal elements, termed Cellular Memory Modules (CMMs). Trithorax-group (trxG) proteins maintain the active state of gene expression while the Polycomb-group (PcG) proteins counteract this activation with a repressive function that is stable over many cell generations and can only be overcome by germline differentiation processes. Polycomb Gene complexes or PcG silencing consist of at least three kinds of multiprotein complex Polycomb Repressive Complex 1 (PRC1), PRC2 and PhoRC. These complexes work together to carry out their repressive effect. PcGs proteins are evolutionarily conserved and exist in at least two separate protein complexes; the PcG repressive complex 1 (PRC1) and the PcG repressive complex 2–4 (PRC2/3/4). PRC2 catalyzes trimethylation of lysine 27 on histone H3 (H3K27me2/3), while PRC1 mono- ubiquitinates histone H2A on lysine 119 (H2AK119Ub1).

== In mammals ==
In mammals Polycomb Group gene expression is important in many aspects of development like homeotic gene regulation and X chromosome inactivation, being recruited to the inactive X by Xist RNA, the master regulator of XCI or embryonic stem cell self-renewal. The Bmi1 polycomb ring finger protein promotes neural stem cell self-renewal. Murine null mutants in PRC2 genes are embryonic lethals while most PRC1 mutants are live born homeotic mutants that die perinatally. In contrast overexpression of PcG proteins correlates with the severity and invasiveness of several cancer types. The mammalian PRC1 core complexes are very similar to Drosophila. Polycomb Bmi1 is known to regulate ink4 locus (p16^{Ink4a}, p19^{Arf}).

Regulation of Polycomb-group proteins at bivalent chromatin sites is performed by SWI/SNF complexes, which oppose the accumulation of Polycomb complexes through ATP-dependent eviction.

=== Recruitment in X chromosome inactivation ===
X chromosome inactivation (XCI) is the phenomenon that has been selected during the evolution to balance X-linked gene dosage between XX females and XY males. It is can be divided into two phases: the establishment phase when gene silencing is reversible, and maintenance phase when gene silencing becomes irreversible. During the establishment phase XCI, Xist RNA, the master regulator of this process, is monoallelically upregulated, and it spreads in cis along the future inactive X (Xi), relocating to the nuclear periphery. and recruits repressive chromatin-remodelling complexes, including proteins of the polycomb repressive complexes. Whether Xist directly recruits polycomb repressive complex 2 (PRC2) to the chromatin or this recruitment is the consequence of Xist-mediated changes on the chromatin has been the object of intense debate.

==== Mechanism ====
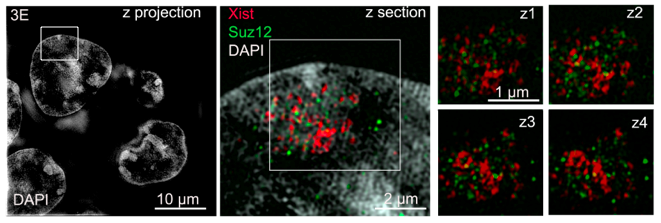
One super resolution study showed that Xist and PRC2 do not directly interact (above), a second study that they are tightly and statistically significantly linked.

Some studies showed that PRC2 components are not associated with Xist RNA or do not interact functionally. Another has shown, by means of mass spectrometry analysis, that two subunits of PRC2 may interact with Xist, although these proteins are also found in other complexes and are not unique components of the PRC2 complex.

PRC2 binds the A-repeat (RepA) of Xist RNA directly and with very high affinity (dissociation constants of 10-100 nanomolar), supporting Xist-mediated recruitment of PRC2 to the X chromosome. It is unclear if such interactions occurs in vivo under physiological conditions. Failure to turn up PRC2 proteins in function screens may result from incomplete screens or because cells cannot survive or compete without PRC2. Two super-resolution microscopy analyses have presented divergent views: one showed that Xist and PRC2 are spatially separated, the other that Xist and PRC2 are tightly linked. Recruitment of PCR could occur through several mechanisms in parallel, including direct Xist-mediated recruitment, adaptor proteins, chromatin changes, RNA pol II exclusion, or PRC1 recruitment. For instance, PRC2 recruitment is linked to PRC1-mediated H2A119 ubiquitination in differentiating embryonic stem cells (ESCs). where PRC1 recruitment is mediated by hnrnpK and Xist repB. In fully differentiated cells, PRC2 recruitment seems to be dependent on Xist RepA. Alternative and complementary pathways, such as phase separation, could also be at work to establish PRC2 recruitment on the X in different experimental systems and during different stages of development. See also work from the Tartaglia lab.

== In plants ==
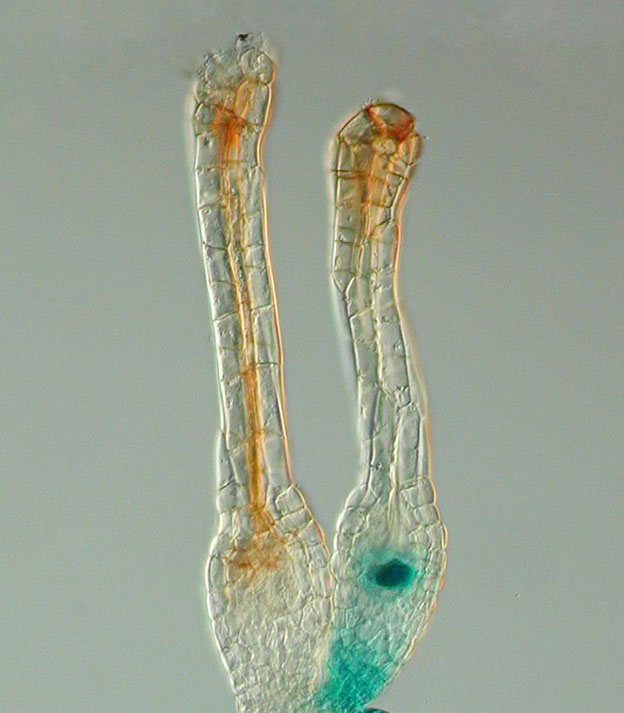
The Polycomb gene FIE is expressed (blue) in unfertilised egg cells of the moss Physcomitrella patens (right) and expression ceases after fertilisation in the developing diploid sporophyte (left). In situ GUS staining of two female sex organs (archegonia) of a transgenic plant expressing a translational fusion of FIE-uidA under control of the native FIE promoter

In Physcomitrella patens the PcG protein FIE is specifically expressed in stem cells such as the unfertilized egg cell. Soon after fertilisation the FIE gene is inactivated in the young embryo. The Polycomb gene FIE is expressed in unfertilised egg cells of the moss Physcomitrella patens and expression ceases after fertilisation in the developing diploid sporophyte.

It has been shown that unlike in mammals the PcG are necessary to keep the cells in a differentiated state. Consequently, loss of PcG causes de-differentiation and promotes embryonic development.

Polycomb-group proteins also intervene in the control of flowering by silencing the Flowering Locus C gene. This gene is a central part of the pathway that inhibits flowering in plants and its silencing during winter is suspected to be one of the main factors intervening in plant vernalization.

== See also ==
- PRC1
- PRC2
- PHC1
- PHC2
- Heterochromatin protein 1 (Cbx)
- BMI1
- PCGF1, KDM2B
- PCGF2 (Polycomb group RING finger protein 2) ortolog Bmi1
- RYBP
- RING1
- SUV39H1 (histone-lysine N-methyltransferase)
- L3mbtl2
- EZH2 (Enhancer of Zeste Homolog 2)
- EED
- SUZ12 (Suppressor of Zeste 12)
- Jarid2 (jumonji, AT rich interactive domain 2)
- RE1-silencing transcription factor (REST)
- RNF2
- CBFβ
- YY1
- Bivalent chromatin
