= Douglas L. Coleman =

Canadian-American physiologist and biochemist

- Born: Douglas Leonard Coleman; October 6, 1931; Stratford, Ontario; Canada
- Died: April 16, 2014 (aged 82); Lamoine, Maine; United States
- Education: McMaster University (BSc); University of Wisconsin–Madison (PhD)
- Known for: Prediction of the existence of leptin
- Spouse: Beverly J. Benallick (died 2009)
- Children: 3
- Awards: Canada Gairdner International Award; Shaw Prize in Life science and Medicine; Albert Lasker Award for Basic Medical Research; BBVA Foundation Frontiers of Knowledge Award; King Faisal International Prize in Medicine
- Scientific career
- Fields: Physiology; Biochemistry
- Workplaces: Jackson Laboratory
- Thesis: Studies on the saturation of sterols by intestinal bacteria (1958)
- Doctoral advisor: Carl August Baumann

Douglas L. Coleman (October 6, 1931 - April 16, 2014) was a scientist and professor emeritus at the Jackson Laboratory, in Bar Harbor, Maine. His work predicted that there exists a hormone that can cause mice to feel full, and that a mutation in the gene encoding this hormone can lead to obesity. The gene and corresponding hormone were discovered about 20 years later by Jeffrey M. Friedman, Rudolph Leibel, and their research teams at Rockefeller University, which Friedman named leptin.

== Early life and education ==
Coleman was born in Stratford, Ontario, Canada in 1931. He was the first in his family to finish high school. He obtained his BSc from McMaster University in 1954. At the encouragement of a biochemistry professor at McMaster, Coleman attended the University of Wisconsin–Madison for a PhD, which he obtained in 1958.

== Career ==
After receiving his PhD, Coleman did not continue in academia or entered the industry, as was common at the time. Instead, he became an associate staff scientist at the Roscoe B. Jackson Memorial Laboratory (now Jackson Laboratory) in Bar Harbor, Maine. Initially planning to stay one to two years, Coleman ended up spending his entire career at the Jackson Laboratory.

He was promoted to a staff scientist at Jackson Laboratory in 1961 and became a senior staff scientist in 1968. He was the assistant director of research from 1968 to 1970 and interim director between 1975 and 1976.

Coleman retired in 1991 at the age of 62.

== Research ==
Before Coleman's experiments, there was evidence that the hypothalamus was a master regulator of energy balance by responding to a factor that traveled in blood. When Coleman joined the Jackson Laboratory, only one obese mouse strain existed. This strain contained a mutation, called ob (for obese), at both copies of the DNA at chromosome 6, and so was designated ob/ob.

In 1966, Coleman and his colleagues reported a second obese mouse strain that looked very similar to ob/ob mice but had another mutation. The mutation occurred in chromosome 4 and was called db (for diabetes). A major difference between the two strains was that the db/db mice had severe diabetes while the ob/ob mice only mild diabetes. Importantly, only mice that were homozygous with the ob or db mutation (meaning they had the mutation at both copies of the DNA) were obese. This meant in these two strains, obesity was an autosomal recessive trait.

Coleman wondered if there existed a biological molecule that caused obesity and was produced in a db/db but not normal mice, or, conversely, if there existed a molecule that prevented obesity in normal mice. Aware of previous parabiosis experiments by William Hervey from the University of Cambridge, who surgically joined the blood vessels of normal rats with rats that had injuries at the hypothalamus, Coleman performed similar experiments on normal, ob/ob and db/db mice. He first joined db/db mice to normal ones, and found that normal mice dramatically ate less, had a large decrease in plasma glucose and insulin levels, and eventually died, while db/db mice were unaffected and kept gaining fat and weight.

He then joined ob/ob mice with normal mice, and observed a completely different scenario: normal mice had no changes but ob/ob mice ate less and lost weight. When Coleman ended the union, ob/ob mice gained weight and became obese again. Lastly, when ob/ob and db/db mice were surgically joined together, db/db mice kept gaining weight whereas ob/ob mice significantly reduced their food intake and weight and died.

His findings led Coleman to conclude that ob/ob mice lacked a circulating factor that regulates food intake and weight, and that db/db mice overproduced this factor but could not respond to it. When db/db mice was joined to ob/ob or normal mice, however, this factor traveled through blood to the other mouse and reduced their eating and weight. Connecting these results to contemporary understanding, he also hypothesized that the hypothalamus contained the area that responded to the circulating factor.

About 20 years later, the genes where ob and db mutations occurred were identified by Jeffrey M. Friedman, Rudolph Leibel (both from Rockefeller University) and Louis Tartaglia (from Millennium Pharmaceuticals, now acquired by Takeda Pharmaceutical Company and renamed Takeda Oncology). The ob gene is now known as LEP and the protein hormone it encodes leptin, a name that Friedman coined. The db gene has been confirmed to be a receptor for the leptin protein, and was renamed LEPR.

== Personal life, philanthropy, and death ==
Coleman met his wife, Beverly J. Benallick, during his undergraduate years at McMaster University, where Benallick was the only female chemistry major at the time. Benallick died in 2009.

After retirement, Coleman was involved in forest management, land protection, and nature conservation. He created recreational trails in his 20-hectare woodland for the public and especially students, and also helped his wife found a wildlife garden for people not able to walk the woodland. He was a director and president of the Frenchman Bay Conservancy, and a longtime member of the Lamoine Planning Board.

He established two US$100,000 funds at the Jackson Laboratory: the Douglas Coleman Research Fund to support early-career scientists studying obesity and diabetes, and the Beverly Coleman Memorial Fund to support young students and educational programmes.

Coleman died in Lamoine, Maine on April 16, 2014.

== Honors and awards ==
- Member of the National Academy of Sciences (1998)
- Canada Gairdner International Award (2005)
- Shaw Prize in Life Science and Medicine (2009)
- Albert Lasker Award for Basic Medical Research (2010)
- BBVA Foundation Frontiers of Knowledge Award (2012)
- King Faisal International Prize in Medicine (now King Faisal Prize in Medicine) (2013)
