= Tartaglia =

Tartaglia may refer to:

== People ==
- Angelo Tartaglia (1350 or 1370–1421), Italian condottiero and nobleman
- Nicolo Tartaglia (1499/1500–1557), Venetian mathematician and engineer
- Ivo Tartaglia (1880–1949), Yugoslav politician
- Marino Tartaglia (1894–1984), Croatian painter and art teacher
- Warren Tartaglia (1944–1965), American jazz musician and poet
- Philip Tartaglia (1951–2021), former Archbishop of Glasgow
- Robert Tartaglia (born 1959), American racing driver
- Louis Tartaglia (born 1963), American biochemist, pharmaceutical scientist, and entrepreneur
- Antonio Tartaglia (born 1968), Italian bobsledder
- James Tartaglia (born 1973), British philosopher
- Gian Gaetano Tartaglia (born 1976), Italian biophysicist and computational biologist
- John Tartaglia (born 1978), American puppeteer, actor, and singer
- Angelo Tartaglia (footballer) (born 1992), Italian footballer

== Fiction ==
- Tartaglia (commedia dell'arte), commedia dell'arte stock character
- Tartaglia, a character in 2020 video game Genshin Impact
