= Rudolph Leibel =

American medical researcher (born 1942)

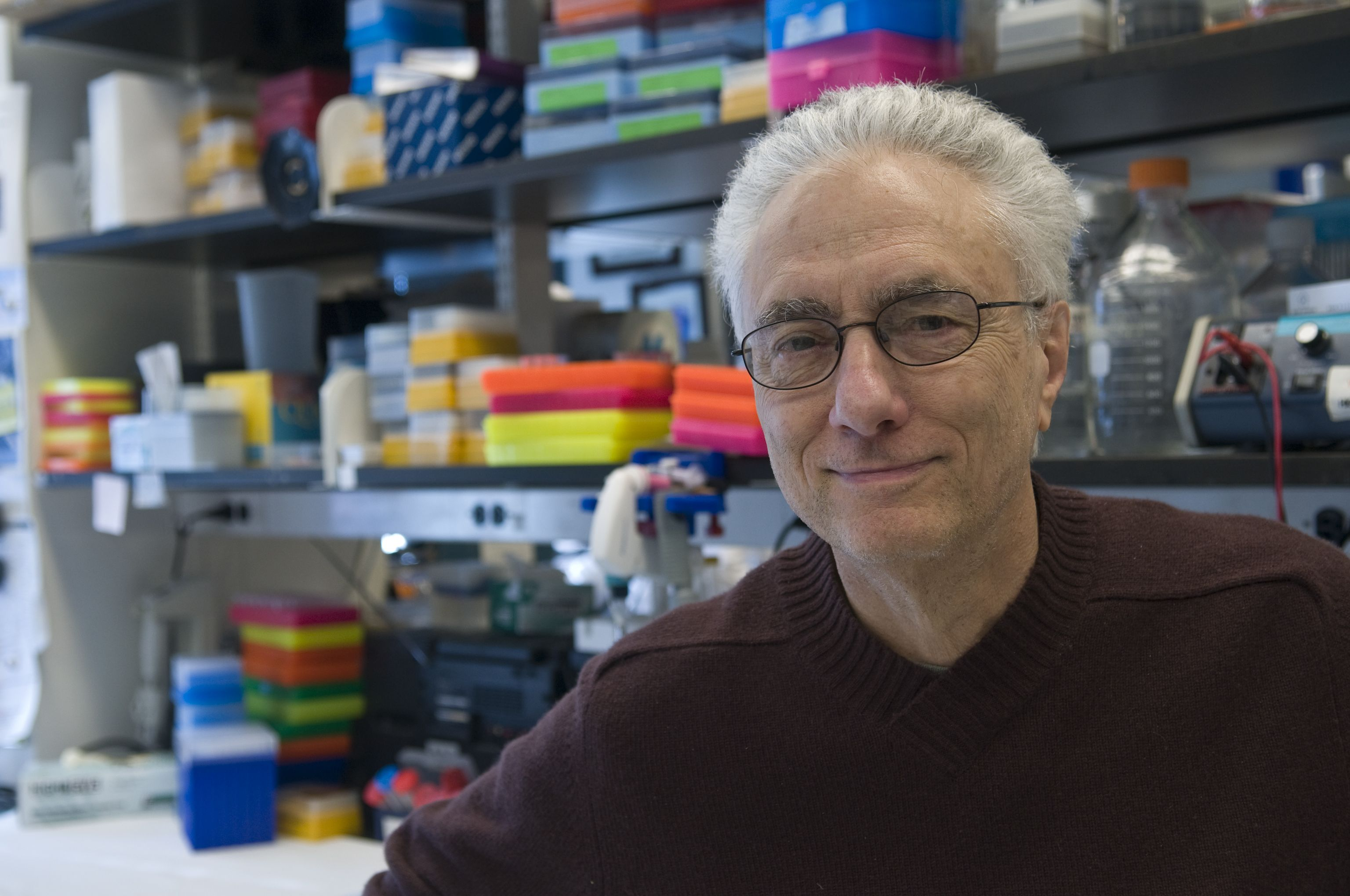
- Rudolph Leibel, 2012
- Born: 1942 (age 83–84); U.S.
- Citizenship: United States
- Education: Colgate University, Albert Einstein College of Medicine
- Known for: Co-Discovery of Leptin, Advancing the Understanding of Obesity
- Spouse: Lulu Leibel
- Awards: National Academy of Sciences Institute of Medicine Member; TOPS Scientific Achievement Award; NIH/HHS Intragency Committee on Human Nutrition Research; New York State Science, Technology and Academic Research (NYSTAR) Distinguished Professor; Albert Einstein College of Medicine Distinguished Alumnus Award; Berthold Medal of the European Society of Endocrinology, Federation Award for Biomedical Research of the Federation of Medical Scientific Societies of the Netherlands, Leiden University; National Institute of Diabetes and Digestive and Kidney Diseases Federal Advisory Council Member; The Christopher J. Murphy Professorship of Diabetes Research at Columbia University; Honoris Causa Doctorate, Louisiana State University
- Scientific career
- Fields: Molecular Genetics, Obesity, Diabetes Mellitus, Pediatrics
- Workplaces: Boston Children's Hospital, Cambridge Hospital, Massachusetts General Hospital, Rockefeller University, Columbia University

Rudolph Leibel (born 1942) is the Christopher J. Murphy Professor of Diabetes Research, Professor of Pediatrics and Medicine at Columbia University Medical Center, and Director of the Division of Molecular Genetics in the Department of Pediatrics. He is also co-director of the Naomi Berrie Diabetes Center and executive director of the Russell and Angelica Berrie Program in Cellular Therapy, Co-director of the New York Obesity Research Center and the Columbia University Diabetes and Endocrinology Research Center.

Leibel's co-discovery at Rockefeller University of the hormone leptin, and cloning of the leptin and leptin receptor genes, has had a major role in the area of understanding human obesity. Leibel has published hundreds of scientific papers on obesity, and has authored and co-authored 70 scientific papers on the topic of leptin specifically.

== Biography ==
Leibel obtained an A.B. from Colgate University in 1963 and an MD in 1967 from Albert Einstein College of Medicine. He was an Intern and Junior Resident in Pediatrics at Massachusetts General Hospital from 1967 to 1969, after which he served as a Major in the United States Army Medical Corps from 1969 to 1971.

== Medical career ==
After serving as a Senior Resident in Medicine at Boston Children's Hospital from 1971 to 1972, Leibel became an NIH Clinical and Research Fellow in Pediatric Endocrinology-Metabolism at Massachusetts General Hospital from 1972 to 1974. He was a Research Associate in the Department of Nutrition and Food Science at the Massachusetts Institute of Technology from 1975 to 1978 and joined Rockefeller University from 1978 to 1981 as a Rockefeller Scholar in Clinical Science. Leibel completed his training as an Established Investigator at the American Heart Association from 1985 to 1989.

Leibel's contributions to the field of obesity research, and childhood obesity specifically, were highlighted in Okie's 2005 book Fed Up!: Winning the War Against Childhood Obesity. He has authored or co-authored over 300 peer-reviewed scientific papers, which have been cited over 13,000 times in the world scientific literature. He also serves on the editorial boards of the Journal of Clinical Investigation, International Journal of Obesity, and Obesity Research, and has received numerous awards for scientific and pioneering work in medical research.

In recognition of his scientific work, Leibel was elected as a member of the Institute of Medicine of the National Academy of Sciences in 1998 and serves as a member of the National Institute of Diabetes and Digestive and Kidney Diseases (NIDDK) Federal Advisory Council. His research is funded by the National Institutes of Health, the American Diabetes Association, the New York State Stem Cell Science Program, the Russell Berrie Foundation and the Leona M. and Harry B. Helmsley Charitable Trust, as well as Astra Zeneca. Leibel also serves as one of four Scientific Steering Committee members of the Type 1 Diabetes Research Consortium, a multi-institutional collaborative program of The Leona M. and Harry B. Helmsley Charitable Trust, that was established in 2009 to better understand the causes of type 1 diabetes and explore potential therapies. As of 2012, the consortium encompassed 11 institutions and 45 investigators through 28 grants totaling $21.8 million.

Leibel is the Chairman of the Selection Committee for the Pollin Prize for Pediatric Research and is the co-director of the NIH Diabetes and Endocrinology Research Center (DERC), at Columbia University.

== Research focus ==
Leibel's initial research was focused on adrenergic receptor-mediated effects on lipolysis, and on the control of fatty acid re-esterification in human adipose tissue. Being among the first investigators to describe anatomic site-related differences in alpha 2 and beta 1 adrenoceptor activity in human adipose tissue, Leibel was also one of the first scientists to assess the role of alpha 2 and beta 1 adrenoceptor in determining the sexual dimorphism in human adipose tissue distribution.

In addition to cloning the mouse mahoganoid mutation that modifies the obesity of Yellow mice, Leibel also developed a microassay system for quantifying the re-esterification pathway in human adipose tissue. This invention has led to elucidation of the control mechanisms involved with circulating free fatty acids in humans.

After Leibel's co-discovery of the leptin gene in 1994, which involved a reverse genetic/positional cloning strategy to clone ob and db, Leibel, working with collaborators at Millennium Pharmaceuticals and colleague Streamson Chua, confirmed cloning of the leptin receptor by demonstrating that an apparent leptin receptor cloned from a choroid plexus library using leptin as ligand, mapped to a physical map that included db and fa.

The efforts of the Leibel laboratory at Columbia University focus on the genetics of obesity and non-insulin dependent diabetes, or diabetes mellitus type 2. The laboratory has mapped, cloned and identified mutations in the obese and fatty genes in humans, rats, and mice and focuses on defining the physiological basis by which signaling networks regulate body size and composition. The Leibel laboratory is also working to isolate additional human and rodent genes that influence body weight and the susceptibility to diabetes mellitus type 2 in the context of obesity.

== Research on the "obesity gene": Leptin ==
Having encountered obesity in children as a medical doctor in the 1970s, Leibel believed that biology played a stronger role than "willpower" in human obesity and joined Jules Hirsch in theorizing about the psychobiology of obesity - a belief that body weight was the result of complex interactions between genes and the environment rather than a simple matter of free will. In 1978, based on his theory that genetics played a major role in determining body weight regulation in humans, Leibel left Harvard University to join Jules Hirsch at Rockefeller University with the goal of finding the factor that drove eating. In collaboration with Douglas Coleman, Leibel determined that a mutation of the ob gene resulted in mice that were unable to manufacture a working satiety-signaling protein and that a db mutation resulted in mice that had the protein, but lacked the ability to detect the signal.

Leibel and Hirsch began a series of scientific investigations aimed at determining any connections between genetics and obesity. Over the course of eight years, Leibel's work ranged from studies of glycerol to the development of a radioisotopic technique for analysis of free fatty acid re-esterification in human adipose tissue to the metabolic characterization of obesity. After concluding that the tools of molecular genetics were key to moving his research forward and finding the obesity gene, Leibel initiated a collaboration with Rockefeller University faculty member and molecular biologist Jeffrey Friedman in 1986, and began to assemble a team of researchers including Streamson C. Chua, Nathan Bahary, Don Siegel, Yiying Zhang, Ricardo Proenca and others. Leibel obtained ongoing funding from the National Institutes of Health and other sources, allowing the team to develop and utilize new techniques in their research such as chromosome microdissection.

As their research progressed, Leibel at al published a series of papers in scientific journals that reported the mapping of the ob gene, the first of these being a 1990 paper in World Review of Nutrition and Dietetics entitled "Genetic Variation and Nutrition in Obesity: Approaches to the Molecular Genetics of Obesity", and another 1990 paper in the Proceedings of the National Academy of Sciences entitled "Molecular Mapping of the Mouse db Mutation".

Among numerous additional papers published on the topic between 1991 and 1994, Leibel was the lead author of a paper entitled "Strategies for the Molecular Genetic Analysis of Obesity in Humans" in 1993. In 1994, Friedman published a scientific paper that discovered and isolated the ob gene. Leibel was not a co-author of this paper, however, although Leibel was acknowledged in fine print at the end of the paper as an "important contributor to the early phases of this work". Leibel was bitter about not being included as a full co-author and being relegated to a section of special thanks that included Friedman's fiancée, who was not a scientist; various theories surrounding the omission of Leibel as co-author of this important paper are presented in Ellen Ruppel Shell's 2002 book The Hungry Gene.

Leibel continued to author and co-author numerous papers on the connection between genetics and obesity. In 1997, he published a paper in the scientific journal Nature Genetics titled "And Finally, Genes for Human Obesity". Leibel and others involved with the discovery of the obesity gene eventually left Rockefeller University to establish a research base at Columbia University where Leibel became the head of the Division of Molecular Genetics.

== Press and media ==
Leibel was featured throughout HBO's The Weight of the Nation series in 2012 as a key scientific commentator. He has been featured on numerous television news shows such as Charlie Rose, and is often featured in the popular press.

== Awards and recognition ==
1. Phi Beta Kappa
2. Alpha Omega Alpha
3. Austen-Colgate Scholar
4. NIH Postdoctoral Fellowship
5. Rockefeller Scholar in Clinical Science
6. Established Investigator, American Heart Association
7. Eliot Hochstein Award for excellence in teaching, Cornell University Medical College
8. Senior List for excellence in teaching, Cornell University Medical College
9. TOPS Scientific Achievement Award (NAASO - 1996)
10. NIH/HHS Intragency Committee on Human Nutrition Research (1997)
11. Member, Institute of Medicine, National Academy of Sciences
12. New York State Science, Technology and Academic Research (NYSTAR) Distinguished Professor (2002)
13. Distinguished Alumnus Award, Albert Einstein College of Medicine (2005)
14. Berthold Medal of the European Society of Endocrinology (2008)
15. Federation Award for Biomedical Research of the Federation of Medical Scientific Societies of the Netherlands, Leiden University. (2008)
16. Member, National Institute of Diabetes and Digestive and Kidney Diseases Federal Advisory Council
17. The Christopher J. Murphy Professorship of Diabetes Research (2011)
18. Louisiana State University/Pennington Biomedical Research Honoris Causa Doctorate (2012)

== Published works ==
- Leibel, RL; Hirsch, J (1985). "Metabolic characterization of obesity". Ann Intern Med. 103 (6_Part_2): 1000–2. doi:10.7326/0003-4819-103-6-1000. PMID 4062114.
- Leibel, RL; Hirsch, J; Berry, EM; Gruen, RK (1985). "Alterations in adipocyte free fatty acid re-esterification associated with obesity and weight reduction in man". Am J Clin Nutr. 42 (2): 198–206. doi:10.1093/ajcn/42.2.198. PMID 4025192.
- Leibel, RL; Hirsch, J (1985). "A radioisotopic technique for analysis of free fatty acid reesterification in human adipose tissue". Am J Physiol. 248 (1 Pt 1): E140-7. doi:10.1152/ajpendo.1985.248.1.e140. PMID 3881046.
- Leibel, RL (1985). "A radioisotopic method for the measurement of free fatty acid turnover and adrenoceptor response in small fragments of human adipose tissue". Int J Obes. 9 (Suppl 1): 137–43. PMID 4066120.
- Friedman, JM; Leibel, RL; Bahary, N (1991). "Molecular mapping of obesity genes". Mamm Genome. 1 (3): 130–44. doi:10.1007/bf00351059. PMID 1797227. S2CID 20883213.
- Chua, SC Jr; Leibel, RL; Hirsch, J (1991). "Food deprivation and age modulate neuropeptide gene expression in the murine hypothalamus and adrenal gland". Brain Res Mol Brain Res. 9 (1–2): 95–101. doi:10.1016/0169-328x(91)90134-j. PMID 1850082.
- Friedman, JM; Leibel, RL; Bahary, N; Siegel, DA; Truett, G (1991). "Genetic analysis of complex disorders. Molecular mapping of obesity genes in mice and humans". Ann N Y Acad Sci. 630: 100–15. doi:10.1111/j.1749-6632.1991.tb19579.x. PMID 1683202. S2CID 84042570.
- Truett, GE; Bahary, N; Friedman, JM; Leibel, RL (1991). "Rat obesity gene fatty (fa) maps to chromosome 5: evidence for homology with the mouse gene diabetes (db)". Proc Natl Acad Sci U S A. 88 (17): 7806–9. Bibcode:1991PNAS...88.7806T. doi:10.1073/pnas.88.17.7806. PMC 52392. PMID 1881916.
- Bahary, N; Zorich, G; Pachter, JE; Leibel, RL; Friedman, JM (1991). "Molecular genetic linkage maps of mouse chromosomes 4 and 6". Genomics. 11 (1): 33–47. doi:10.1016/0888-7543(91)90099-z. PMID 1684952.
- Chua, SC Jr; Brown, AW; Kim, J; Hennessey, KL; Leibel, RL; Hirsch, J (1991). "Food deprivation and hypothalamic neuropeptide gene expression: effects of strain background and the diabetes mutation". Brain Res Mol Brain Res. 11 (3–4): 291–9. doi:10.1016/0169-328x(91)90038-y. PMID 1684630.
- Friedman, JM; Leibel, RL; Siegel, DS; Walsh, J; Bahary, N (1991). "Molecular mapping of the mouse ob mutation". Genomics. 11 (4): 1054–62. doi:10.1016/0888-7543(91)90032-a. PMID 1686014.
- Hirsch, J; Leibel, RL; Chua, SC (1992). "A clinical perspective on peptides and food intake". Am J Clin Nutr. 55 (1 Suppl): 296S–298S. doi:10.1093/ajcn/55.1.296s. PMID 1728843.
- Friedman, JM; Leibel, RL (1992). "Tackling a weighty problem". Cell. 69 (2): 217–20. doi:10.1016/0092-8674(92)90402-x. PMID 1568242. S2CID 5968401.
- Bahary, N; Pachter, JE; Felman, R; Leibel, RL; Albright, K; Cram, S; Friedman, JM (1992). "Molecular mapping of mouse chromosomes 4 and 6: use of a flow-sorted Robertsonian chromosome". Genomics. 13 (3): 761–9. doi:10.1016/0888-7543(92)90151-h. PMID 1639403.
- Chua, SC; Hennessey, K; Zeitler, P; Leibel, RL (1993). "The little (lit) mutation cosegregates with the growth hormone releasing factor receptor on mouse chromosome 6". Mamm Genome. 4 (10): 555–9. doi:10.1007/bf00361384. PMID 8268652. S2CID 10839402.
- Smoller, JW; Truett, GE; Hirsch, J; Leibel, RL (1993). "A molecular genetic method for genotyping fatty (fa/fa) rats". Am J Physiol. 264 (1 Pt 2): R8-11. doi:10.1152/ajpregu.1993.264.1.R8. PMID 8094275.
- Smoller, JW; Truett, GE; Hirsch, J; Leibel, RL (1993). "The Zucker fatty (fa) gene is not a mutation of corticotropin-releasing factor". Am J Physiol. 264 (1 Pt 2): R12-5. doi:10.1152/ajpregu.1993.264.1.R12. PMID 8430872.
- Bahary, N; Siegel, DA; Walsh, J; Zhang, Y; Leopold, L; Leibel, R; Proenca, R; Friedman, JM (1993). "Microdissection of proximal mouse chromosome 6: identification of RFLPs tightly linked to the ob mutation". Mamm Genome. 4 (9): 511–5. doi:10.1007/bf00364786. PMID 7906968. S2CID 2130385.
- Chua, SC Jr; Hansen, MH; Truett, GE; Leibel, RL (1993). "Utility of a C-jun microsatellite marker in determining gene dosage for fatty (fa)". Obes Res. 1 (6): 475–80. doi:10.1002/j.1550-8528.1993.tb00030.x. PMID 16350322.
- Power, LM; Chua, SC Jr; Leibel, RL (1994). "Locus D1S21 contains exonic sequence from the C8 beta component of complement". Mamm Genome. 5 (2): 125–6. doi:10.1007/bf00292344. PMID 8180476. S2CID 33473612.
- Rose, PM; Lynch, JS; Frazier, ST; et al. (February 1997). "Molecular genetic analysis of a human neuropeptide Y receptor. The human homolog of the murine "Y5" receptor may be a pseudogene". J. Biol. Chem. 272 (6): 3622–7. doi:10.1074/jbc.272.6.3622. PMID 9013614.
- Chagnon, YC; Pérusse, L; Lamothe, M; Chagnon, M; Nadeau, A; Dionne, FT; Gagnon, J; Chung, WK; Leibel, RL; Bouchard, C (1997). "Suggestive linkages between markers on human 1p32-p22 and body fat and insulin levels in the Quebec Family Study". Obes Res. 5 (2): 115–21. doi:10.1002/j.1550-8528.1997.tb00651.x. PMID 9112246.
- Kahle, EB; Butz, KG; Chua, SC; Kershaw, EE; Leibel, RL; Fenger, TW; Hansen, CT; Michaelis, OE (1997). "The rat corpulent (cp) mutation maps to the same interval on (Pgm1-Glut1) rat chromosome 5 as the fatty (fa) mutation". Obes Res. 5 (2): 142–5. doi:10.1002/j.1550-8528.1997.tb00654.x. PMID 9112249.
- Chung, WK; Chua, SC; Lee, GH; Leibel, RL (1997). "Polymerase chain reaction-restriction fragment length polymorphisms (PCR-RFLP) and electrophoretic assays for the mouse obese (Lepob) mutation". Obes Res. 5 (3): 183–5. doi:10.1002/j.1550-8528.1997.tb00291.x. PMID 9192391.
- Overton, JD; Leibel, RL (May 2011). "Mahoganoid and mahogany mutations rectify the obesity of the yellow mouse by effects on endosomal traffic of MC4R protein". J. Biol. Chem. 286 (21): 18914–29. doi:10.1074/jbc.M111.224592. PMC 3099707. PMID 21460229.
- Phan, LK; Chung, WK; Leibel, RL (Sep 2006). "The mahoganoid mutation (Mgrn1md) improves insulin sensitivity in mice with mutations in the melanocortin signaling pathway independently of effects on adiposity". Am J Physiol Endocrinol Metab. 291 (3): E611–20. doi:10.1152/ajpendo.00034.2006. PMID 16638826. S2CID 1359762.
- Phan, LK; Lin, F; LeDuc, CA; Chung, WK; Leibel, RL (Nov 2002). "The mouse mahoganoid coat color mutation disrupts a novel C3HC4 RING domain protein". J Clin Invest. 110 (10): 1449–59. doi:10.1172/JCI16131. PMC 151815. PMID 12438443.
- Lindberg, UB; Leibel, RL; Silfverstolpe, G; Hirsch, J; Björntorp, P; Rébuffé-Scrive, M (1991). "Effects of early pregnancy on regional adipose tissue metabolism". Horm Metab Res. 23 (1): 25–9. doi:10.1055/s-2007-1003603. PMID 2016077. S2CID 260165891.
- Edens, NK; Leibel, RL; Hirsch, J (1990). "Mechanism of free fatty acid re-esterification in human adipocytes in vitro". J Lipid Res. 31 (8): 1423–31. doi:10.1016/S0022-2275(20)42613-6. PMID 2280183.
- Leibel, RL; Forse, RA; Hirsch, J (1989). "Effects of rapid glucose infusion on in vivo and in vitro free fatty acid re-esterification by adipose tissue of fasted obese subjects". Int J Obes. 13 (5): 661–71. PMID 2583920.
