= Bradley Bernstein =

Biologist (born 1970)

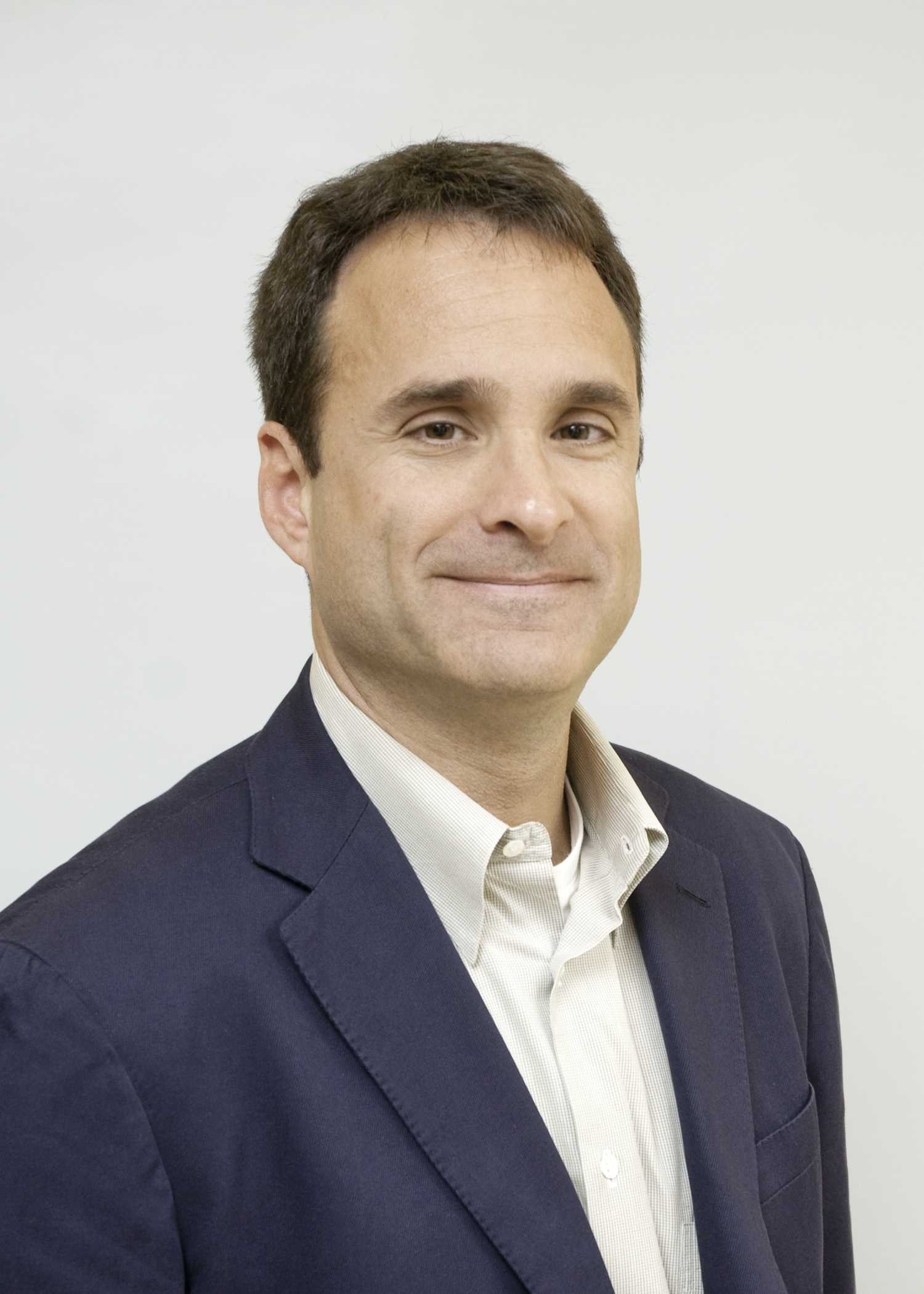
- Born: 1970 (age 55–56)
- Scientific career
- Fields: Epigenomics, developmental biology and cancer
- Institutions: Dana–Farber Cancer Institute, Broad Institute, Harvard Medical School

Bradley E. Bernstein is a biologist and Professor of Cell Biology at Harvard Medical School. He is Chair of the Department of Cancer Biology at the Dana–Farber Cancer Institute and the Director of the Broad Institute's Gene Regulation Observatory. He is known for contributions to the fields of epigenetics and cancer biology.

== Education ==
Bernstein received his B.S. in physics from Yale University, and his Ph.D. and M.D. from the University of Washington School of Medicine.

== Career and research ==
=== Early career ===
Bernstein completed his residency in clinical pathology at Brigham and Women's Hospital, and his post-doctoral research in Stuart Schreiber’s lab at Harvard Chemistry. Together with Stuart Schreiber and Eric Lander (Broad Institute), Bernstein characterized the epigenetic landscape in pluripotent embryonic stem cells, leading to the first characterization of bivalent chromatin.

=== Research ===
Bernstein joined the faculty at Massachusetts General Hospital and Harvard Medical School in 2005. In 2009, he and Alex Meissner launched the Epigenomics Program at the Broad Institute. In 2021, he moved to the Dana–Farber Cancer Institute as Chair of Cancer Biology.

Research in the Bernstein laboratory focuses on epigenetics and how changes in gene activity, as opposed to gene sequence, guide development and lead to disease. The lab uses high-throughput genomic technologies to study how chromatin controls gene activity in different contexts. Bernstein's major contributions include ChIP-seq technology, now the standard for mapping chromatin and protein-DNA interactions in mammalian cells, the characterization of bivalent chromatin that poises developmental genes for alternate fates in development, and the identification of epigenetic defects that cause brain tumors and treatment failures. He also directs epigenome mapping centers for ENCODE and (formerly) the NIH Epigenomics project at the Broad Institute.

== Recognition ==
Bernstein received an Early Career Scientist award from the Howard Hughes Medical Institute (2009), the Paul Marks prize for Cancer Research (2015), and an NIH Pioneer award (2016). He holds the Richard and Nancy Lubin Family Chair at the Dana–Farber Cancer Institute. Bernstein also serves on the editorial board of Science.

Bernstein was elected to the National Academy of Medicine in 2023.
