= Leila Pirhaji =

Iranian computational biologist

- Born: May 17, 1986 (age 40); Esfahan, Iran
- Occupations: Computational biologist, tech entrepreneur

Leila Pirhaji (born May 17, 1986) is an Iranian computational biologist and tech entrepreneur. She is the CEO and founder of ReviveMed, a biotech company that started up in 2018. She previously worked on artificial intelligence at the Professor Ernest Fraenkel Lab at MIT and at ETH Zürich.

== Early life and education ==
Pirhaji was born in Esfahan, Iran on May 17, 1986. She received a Bachelor of Applied Science degree in Biotechnology from the University of Tehran in 2008. Between her undergraduate and master's degree, Pirhaji was a visiting scientist at the ETH Zurich institute, developing algorithms that inferred protein interaction networks from mass spectrometry data. She then pursued a Master's degree in biotechnology immediately after graduation, completing it in 2010. During her time in graduate school, she served a role as Master Research Assistant in developing a new algorithm that predicts gene regulatory networks from gene expression data. In 2010, Pirhaji moved to the US to start her PhD at MIT in Biological/Biosystems Engineering. In 2016, she completed her dissertation, titled “Revealing disease-associated pathways and components by systematic integration of large-scale biological data” under the supervision of Professor Ernest Fraenkel.

== Career ==
In 2013, Pirhaji worked shortly at Takeda Oncology developing a pipeline for Next Generation Sequencing analysis for cancer patients being treated in order to identify biomarkers associated with the drug response. In the summer of 2014, Pirhaji worked at Merck on molecular stratification of pancreatic cancer by using transcriptional and mutational data. From 2011 - 2016, she worked as a doctoral research assistant at MIT, before becoming a postdoctoral research associate in 2016. Not long after graduating from MIT, Pirhaji used her expertise on drug discovery and characterizing molecules from blood tissue to start up her company, ReviveMed, in Cambridge, Massachusetts. Joined by data scientist Demarcus Briers and biotech scientist Richard Howell, Pirhaji raised $1.5 million in funding for ReviveMed from Rivas Capital, TechU, Team Builder Ventures, and WorldQuant.

== Honors and awards ==
In 2019, Pirhaji was selected as a part of the 20 TED Fellows selected for that year.

In 2020, Pirhaji was acknowledge by MIT's Technology Review as one of their 35 Innovators under 35. She has also won funding rounds in competitions held by StartMIT, StartIAP, MIT100K, and the Sandbox Innovation Fund Program for her work in biotechnology.
