= PCGF1 =

Protein-coding gene in the species Homo sapiens

Identifiers
- Aliases: PCGF1, 2010002K04Rik, NSPC1, RNF3A-2, RNF68, polycomb group ring finger 1
- External IDs: OMIM: 610231; MGI: 1917087; GeneCards: PCGF1
Available structures
PDB	Ortholog search: PDBe RCSB
PDB	List of PDB id codes 4HPL, 4HPM

Gene location (Human)
Chr.	Chromosome 2 (human)
Band	2p13.1	Start	74,505,043 bp
Band	2p13.1	End	74,507,695 bp

Gene location (Mouse)
Chr.	Chromosome 6 (mouse)
Band	6 C3|6 35.94 cM	Start	83,054,850 bp
Band	6 C3|6 35.94 cM	End	83,057,836 bp
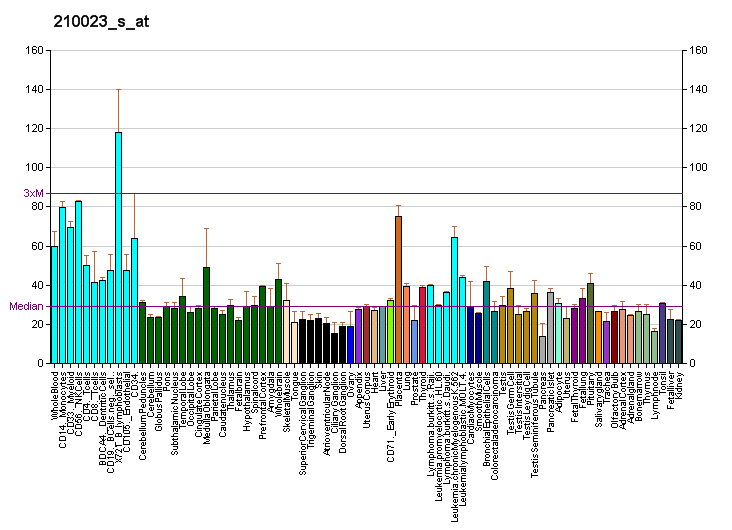

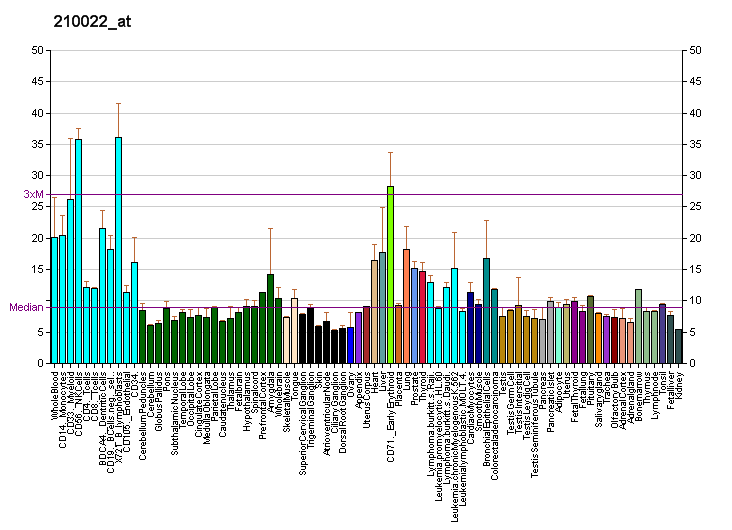
RNA expression pattern
Bgee	Human / Mouse (ortholog); Top expressed in: oocyte; secondary oocyte; granulocyte; mucosa of transverse colon; right lobe of liver; right hemisphere of cerebellum; pituitary gland; body of stomach; body of pancreas; right uterine tube / Top expressed in: secondary oocyte; zygote; primary oocyte; adrenal gland; genital tubercle; bone marrow; morula; neural layer of retina; olfactory bulb; pancreas; More reference expression data
BioGPS	More reference expression data
Gene ontology
Molecular function	protein C-terminus binding; protein binding; metal ion binding; promoter-specific chromatin binding
Cellular component	PcG protein complex; nucleus; nucleoplasm; PRC1 complex
Biological process	histone H2A monoubiquitination; transcription, DNA-templated; regulation of transcription, DNA-templated; histone H2A-K119 monoubiquitination; negative regulation of transcription by RNA polymerase II
Sources:Amigo / QuickGO
Orthologs
Databases	NCBI: entry; OMA: entry
Species	Human	Mouse
Entrez	84759	69837
Ensembl	ENSG00000115289	ENSMUSG00000069678
UniProt	Q9BSM1	Q8R023
RefSeq (mRNA)	NM_032673	NM_197992
RefSeq (protein)	NP_116062	NP_932109; NP_001390487; NP_001390488; NP_001390489; NP_001390490
Location (UCSC)	Chr 2: 74.51 – 74.51 Mb	Chr 6: 83.05 – 83.06 Mb
PubMed search
- Wikidata
View/Edit Human	View/Edit Mouse

Polycomb group RING finger protein 1, PCGF1, also known as NSPC1 or RNF68, is a RING finger domain protein that in humans is encoded by the PCGF1 gene.

PCGF1 is a component defining the non-canonical polycomb repressive complex 1.1 (ncPRC1) interacting with RING1A/B, RYBP, BCOR and KDM2B. PCGF1-BCOR assembles via the ubiquitin-like RAWUL domain of PCGF1 and is recruited on the chromatin at KDM2B sites. Within the PRC1-like complex, PCGF1 regulates RING1B ubiquitin ligase activity that catalyzes the ubiquitination of Lys119 on histone H2A, which then leads to recruitment of PRC2 and H3K27me3 to effectively initiate a polycomb domain and mediate gene repression.
