= Leptin receptor =

Type I cytokine receptor

LEPR

Identifiers
- Aliases: LEPR, CD295, LEP-R, LEPRD, OB-R, OBR, leptin receptor
- External IDs: OMIM: 601007; MGI: 104993; GeneCards: LEPR
Available structures
PDB	Ortholog search: PDBe RCSB
PDB	List of PDB id codes 3V6O

Gene location (Human)
Chr.	Chromosome 1 (human)
Band	1p31.3	Start	65,420,652 bp
Band	1p31.3	End	65,641,559 bp

Gene location (Mouse)
Chr.	Chromosome 4 (mouse)
Band	4 C6|4 46.96 cM	Start	101,574,601 bp
Band	4 C6|4 46.96 cM	End	101,672,549 bp
RNA expression pattern
Bgee	Human / Mouse (ortholog); Top expressed in: trabecular bone; Epithelium of choroid plexus; trigeminal ganglion; pericardium; skin of hip; oral cavity; mucosa of pharynx; lower lobe of lung; skin of thigh; urethra / Top expressed in: lumbar spinal ganglion; Epithelium of choroid plexus; dermis; right lung; mesenteric lymph nodes; aortic valve; membranous bone; Dermatocranium; right lung lobe; Paneth cell; More reference expression data
BioGPS	n/a
Gene ontology
Molecular function	leptin receptor activity; protein binding; identical protein binding; cytokine receptor activity; transmembrane signaling receptor activity; peptide hormone binding; cytokine binding
Cellular component	integral component of membrane; membrane; receptor complex; plasma membrane; extracellular region; basolateral plasma membrane; external side of plasma membrane
Biological process	sexual reproduction; glucose homeostasis; leptin-mediated signaling pathway; cholesterol metabolic process; negative regulation of hydrolase activity; regulation of feeding behavior; multicellular organism development; negative regulation of gluconeogenesis; cell surface receptor signaling pathway; T cell differentiation; angiogenesis; energy homeostasis; bone growth; energy reserve metabolic process; response to leptin; negative regulation of autophagy; regulation of bone remodeling; phagocytosis; positive regulation of cold-induced thermogenesis; glycogen metabolic process; glial cell proliferation
Sources:Amigo / QuickGO
Orthologs
Databases	NCBI: entry; OMA: entry
Species	Human	Mouse
Entrez	3953	16847
Ensembl	ENSG00000116678	ENSMUSG00000057722
UniProt	P48357	P48356
RefSeq (mRNA)	NM_002303; NM_001003679; NM_001003680; NM_001198687; NM_001198688 NM_001198689	NM_001122899; NM_010704; NM_146146
RefSeq (protein)	NP_001003679; NP_001003680; NP_001185616; NP_001185617; NP_001185618 NP_002294	NP_001116371; NP_034834; NP_666258
Location (UCSC)	Chr 1: 65.42 – 65.64 Mb	Chr 4: 101.57 – 101.67 Mb
PubMed search
- Wikidata
View/Edit Human	View/Edit Mouse

Leptin receptor, also known as LEP-R or OB-R, is a type I cytokine receptor, a protein that in humans is encoded by the LEPR gene. LEP-R functions as a receptor for the fat cell-specific hormone leptin. LEP-R has also been designated as CD295 (cluster of differentiation 295). Its location is the cell membrane, and it has extracellular, trans-membrane and intracellular sections (protein regions).

== History ==
The Leptin Receptor was discovered in 1995 by Louis Tartaglia and his colleagues at Millennium Pharmaceuticals. This same team demonstrated the leptin receptor was expressed by the mouse db gene. Furthermore, in 1996, after co-discovering the Leptin gene with Jeffrey Friedman et al. in 1994, (which involved a reverse genetic/positional cloning strategy to clone ob and db), Rudolph Leibel, working with collaborators also at Millennium Pharmaceuticals and colleague Streamson Chua, confirmed cloning of the leptin receptor by demonstrating that an apparent leptin receptor cloned from a choroid plexus library using leptin as ligand, mapped to a physical map that included db and fa.

== Structure ==
Like other cytokine receptors, Leptin receptor protein has three different regions: i) extracellular, ii) trans-membrane, and iii) intracellular. The extracellular part has 5 functional domains: i) membrane distal 1st cytokine receptor homology (CRH1), ii) Immunoglobulin like (Ig), iii) 2nd cytokine receptor homology (CRH2) and iv) two membrane proximal fibronectine type-III (FNIII) domains. CRH1 domains is not essential for Leptin binding, but may have regulatory roles. Ig domain interacts with Leptin and is essential for conformational change in the receptor upon ligand binding. CRH2 is essential for leptin binding, deletion of this domain abolishes the leptin binding. FNIII domains are essential for receptor activation upon leptin binding. The structure of the quaternary complex of the complete extracellular part in complex with the cognate ligand Leptin (i.e. 2 receptor and 2 ligand) has been solved by both electron microscopy and SAXS.

== Function ==
The leptin hormone regulates adipose-tissue mass through hypothalamus effects on hunger and energy use. It acts through the leptin receptor (LEP-R), a single-transmembrane-domain receptor of the cytokine receptor family. In hypothalamic neurons, adequate leptin receptor function and subsequent regulation of energy metabolism and body weight depends on interactions of the receptor with gangliosides in the cell membrane.

== Clinical significance ==
Variations in the leptin receptor have been associated with obesity and with increased susceptibility to Entamoeba histolytica infections.

== Animal models ==
The db/db mouse is a model of obesity, diabetes, and dyslipidemia wherein leptin receptor activity is deficient because the mice are homozygous for a point mutation in the gene for the leptin receptor. In db/db mice, induced swimming helped to overcome obesity by upregulating uncoupling proteins.

== Leptin receptor and pregnancy ==
The leptin hormone and its receptor, also known as maternal plasma leptin, play developmental roles during pregnancy. Leptin receptors have been identified in the placenta of pregnant women and also in fetal tissues. Those leptin receptors are secreted by the placenta; they increase leptin levels during pregnancy thereby aiding the fetal development.
