= MLLT1 =

Protein-coding gene in the species Homo sapiens

Identifiers
- Aliases: MLLT1, ENL, LTG19, YEATS1, myeloid/lymphoid or mixed-lineage leukemia; translocated to, 1, super elongation complex subunit, MLLT1 super elongation complex subunit
- External IDs: OMIM: 159556; MGI: 1927238; GeneCards: MLLT1

Gene location (Human)
Chr.	Chromosome 19 (human)
Band	19p13.3	Start	6,210,381 bp
Band	19p13.3	End	6,279,975 bp

Gene location (Mouse)
Chr.	Chromosome 17 (mouse)
Band	17|17 D	Start	57,199,611 bp
Band	17|17 D	End	57,242,415 bp
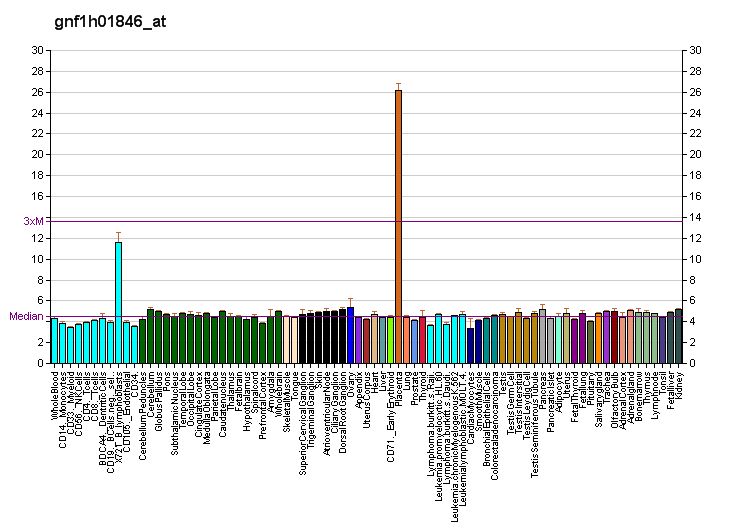

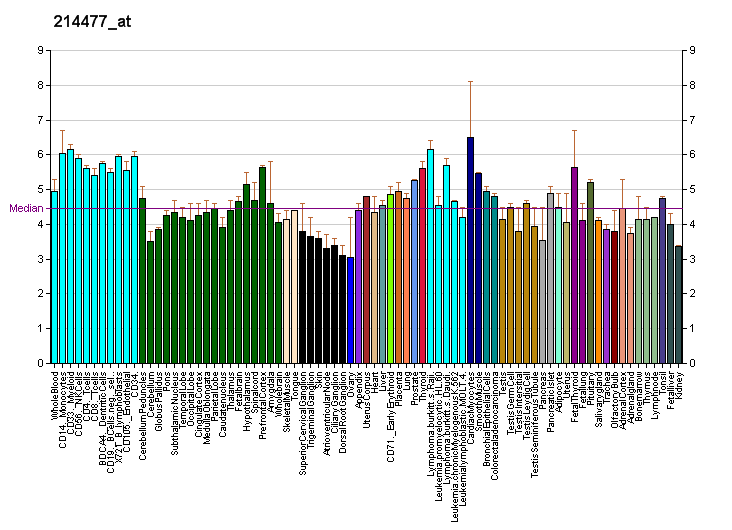
RNA expression pattern
Bgee	Human / Mouse (ortholog); Top expressed in: cardiac muscle tissue of right atrium; placenta; right uterine tube; right hemisphere of cerebellum; myocardium of left ventricle; tibialis anterior muscle; nucleus accumbens; right frontal lobe; ventricular zone; decidua / Top expressed in: ventricular zone; dentate gyrus of hippocampal formation granule cell; genital tubercle; lip; superior frontal gyrus; primary visual cortex; neural tube; tail of embryo; perirhinal cortex; entorhinal cortex; More reference expression data
BioGPS	More reference expression data
Gene ontology
Molecular function	DNA binding; protein binding; DNA-binding transcription factor activity, RNA polymerase II-specific
Cellular component	transcription elongation factor complex; nucleus; fibrillar center; nucleoplasm; cytosol
Biological process	regulation of transcription, DNA-templated; transcription by RNA polymerase II; negative regulation of protein kinase activity; transcription, DNA-templated; transcription elongation from RNA polymerase II promoter; regulation of transcription by RNA polymerase II
Sources:Amigo / QuickGO
Orthologs
Databases	NCBI: entry; OMA: entry
Species	Human	Mouse
Entrez	4298	64144
Ensembl	ENSG00000130382	ENSMUSG00000024212
UniProt	Q03111	Q9ERL0
RefSeq (mRNA)	NM_005934	NM_022328
RefSeq (protein)	NP_005925	NP_071723
Location (UCSC)	Chr 19: 6.21 – 6.28 Mb	Chr 17: 57.2 – 57.24 Mb
PubMed search
- Wikidata
View/Edit Human	View/Edit Mouse

Protein ENL is a protein that in humans is encoded by the MLLT1 gene.

== Interactions ==
MLLT1 has been shown to interact with CBX8.
