= BMI1 =

Human protein

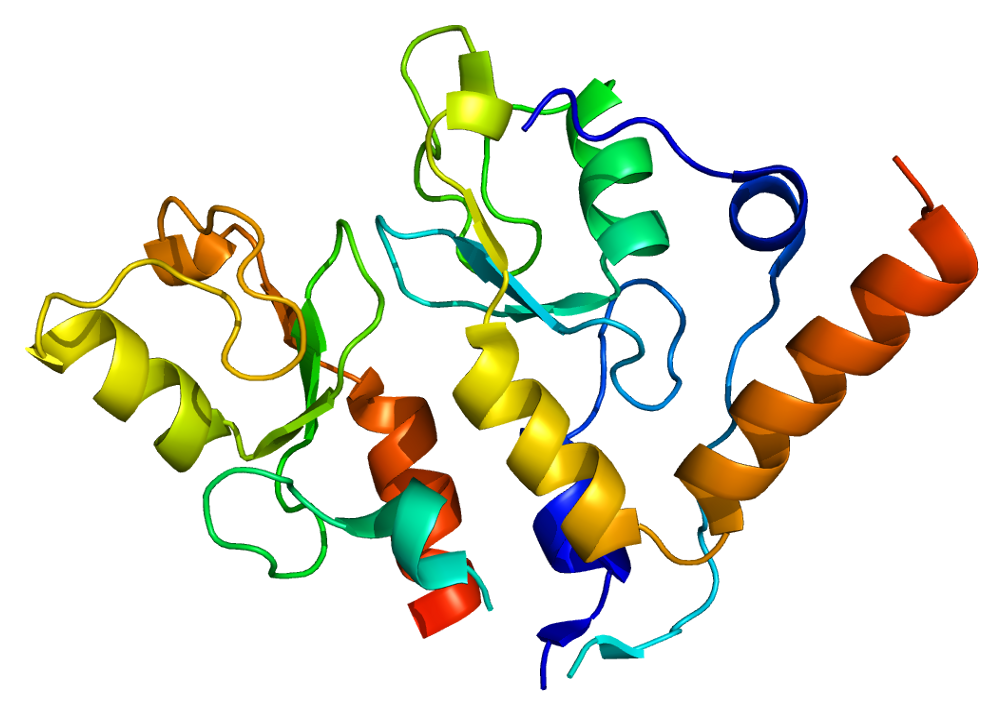

Identifiers
- Aliases: BMI1, FLVI2/PCGF4, RNF51, flvi-2/bmi-1, BMI1 proto-oncogene, polycomb ring finger
- External IDs: OMIM: 164831; GeneCards: BMI1
Available structures
PDB	Human UniProt search: PDBe RCSB
PDB	List of PDB id codes 2H0D, 3RPG, 4R8P

Gene location (Human)
Chr.	Chromosome 10 (human)
Band	10p12.2	Start	22,321,099 bp
Band	10p12.2	End	22,331,484 bp
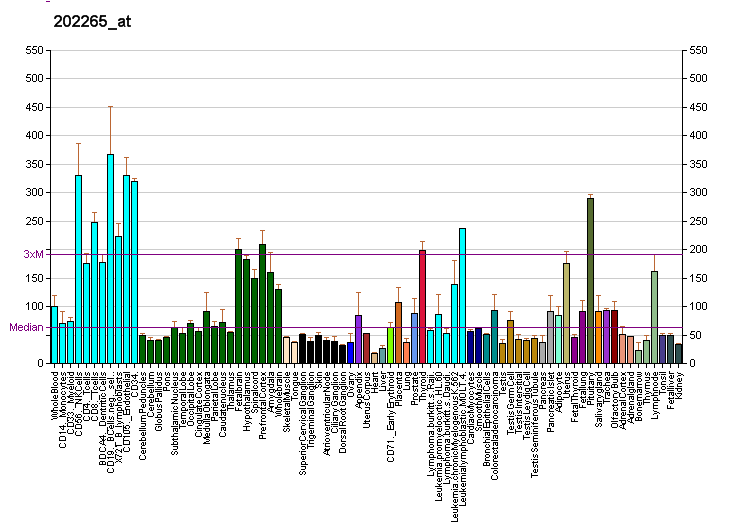
RNA expression pattern
Bgee	Human / Mouse (ortholog); Top expressed in: germinal epithelium; Epithelium of choroid plexus; endothelial cell; optic nerve; Brodmann area 23; visceral pleura; corpus callosum; retinal pigment epithelium; tibia; parietal pleura / n/a; More reference expression data
BioGPS	More reference expression data
Gene ontology
Molecular function	promoter-specific chromatin binding; RING-like zinc finger domain binding; metal ion binding; protein binding; zinc ion binding
Cellular component	cytoplasm; ubiquitin ligase complex; nucleoplasm; PRC1 complex; PcG protein complex; nucleus; cytosol; nuclear body
Biological process	regulation of transcription, DNA-templated; positive regulation of fibroblast proliferation; negative regulation of transcription by RNA polymerase II; transcription, DNA-templated; segment specification; negative regulation of gene expression, epigenetic; positive regulation of ubiquitin-protein transferase activity; regulation of gene expression; histone H2A-K119 monoubiquitination; negative regulation of G0 to G1 transition; chromatin organization; hemopoiesis
Sources:Amigo / QuickGO
Orthologs
Databases	NCBI: entry; OMA: entry
Species	Human	Mouse
Entrez	648	n/a
Ensembl	ENSG00000168283	n/a
UniProt	P35226; Q5T8Z6	n/a
RefSeq (mRNA)	NM_005180	n/a
RefSeq (protein)	NP_001190991; NP_005171	n/a
Location (UCSC)	Chr 10: 22.32 – 22.33 Mb	n/a
PubMed search		n/a
- Wikidata
View/Edit Human

Polycomb complex protein BMI-1 also known as polycomb group RING finger protein 4 (PCGF4) or RING finger protein 51 (RNF51) is a protein that in humans is encoded by the BMI1 gene (B cell-specific Moloney murine leukemia virus integration site 1). BMI1 is a polycomb ring finger oncogene.

== Structure ==
The BMI-1 gene is 10.04 kb with 10 exon and is highly conserved sequence between species. The human BMI-1 gene localizes at chromosome 10 (10p11.23). The Bmi-1 protein is consist of 326 amino acids and has a molecular weight of 36949 Da. Bmi1 has a RING finger at the N-terminus and a central helix-turn-helix domain. The ring finger domain is a cysteine rich domain (CRD) involved in zinc binding and contributes to the ubiquitination process. The binding of bmi-1 to Ring 1B would activate the E3 ubiquitin ligase activity greatly. It is indicated that both the RING domain and the extended N-terminal tail contribute to the interaction of bmi-1 and Ring 1B.

== Function ==
BMI1 (B lymphoma Mo-MLV insertion region 1 homolog) has been reported as an oncogene by regulating p16 and p19, which are cell cycle inhibitor genes. Bmi1 knockout in mice results in defects in hematopoiesis, skeletal patterning, neurological functions, and development of the cerebellum. Recently it has been reported that BMI1 is rapidly recruited to sites of DNA damage, where it sustains for over 8h. Loss of BMI1 leads to radiation sensitive and impaired repair of DNA double-strand breaks by homologous recombination.

Bmi1 is necessary for efficient self-renewing cell divisions of adult hematopoietic stem cells as well as adult peripheral and central nervous system neural stem cells. However, it is less important for the generation of differentiated progeny. Given that phenotypic changes in Bmi1 knockout mice are numerous and that Bmi1 has very broad tissue distribution, it is possible that it regulates the self-renewal of other types of somatic stem cells.

Bmi1 is also thought to inhibit ageing in neurons through the suppression of p53.

The Bmi-1 protein interacts with several signaling pathways containing Wnt, Akt, Notch, Hedgehog and receptor tyrosine kinases (RTK). In Ewing sarcoma family of tumors (ESFT), the knockdown of BMI-1 gene would greatly influence the Notch and Wnt signaling pathway which are important for ESFT formation and development. Bmi-1 was shown to mediate the effect of Hedgehog signaling pathway on mammary stem cell proliferation. Bmi-1 also regulates multiple downstream factors or genes. It represses p19Arf and p16Ink4a. Bmi-1-/- neural stem cells and HSCs have high expression level of p19Arf and p16Ink4a which diminished the proliferation rate. Bmi-1 is also indicated as a key factor in controlling Th2 cell differentiation and development by stabilizing GATA transcription factors.

== Clinical significance ==
Overexpression of Bmi1 seems to play an important role in several types of cancer, such as bladder, skin, prostate, breast, ovarian, colorectal as well as hematological malignancies. Its amplification and overexpression is especially pronounced in mantle cell lymphomas. Inhibiting BMI1 has been shown to inhibit the proliferation of glioblastoma multiforme, chemoresistant ovarian cancer, prostatic, pancreatic and skin cancers. Colorectal cancer stem cell self-renewal was reduced by BMI1 inhibition. The colon cancer stem cells in mouse xenografts could be eliminated by inhibiting BMI-1 gene, providing a novel potential method to treat colorectal cancer.

According to a study by Canadian doctors, the loss of the BMI1 gene expression in human neurons may play a direct role in the development of Alzheimer's disease.

== Interactions ==
BMI1 has been shown to interact with:

- PHC1,
- PHC2,
- RING1, and
- ZBTB16,

== See also ==
- List of intestinal stem cell marker genes
