= CBX8 =

Protein-coding gene in humans

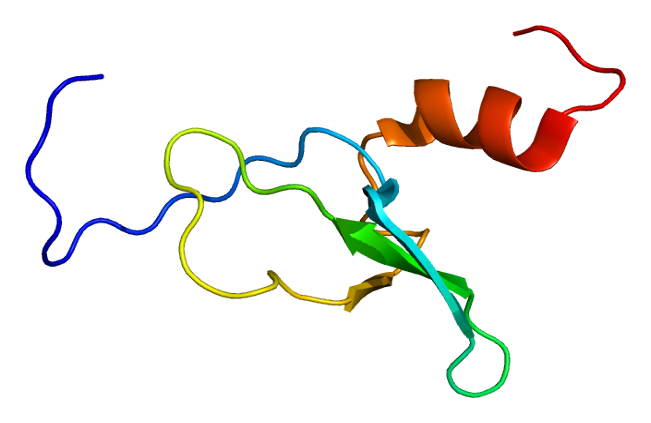

Identifiers
- Aliases: CBX8, PC3, RC1, chromobox 8
- External IDs: OMIM: 617354; MGI: 1353589; GeneCards: CBX8
Available structures
PDB	Ortholog search: PDBe RCSB
PDB	List of PDB id codes 3I91, 5EQ0, 2N4Q

Gene location (Human)
Chr.	Chromosome 17 (human)
Band	17q25.3	Start	79,792,132 bp
Band	17q25.3	End	79,801,683 bp

Gene location (Mouse)
Chr.	Chromosome 11 (mouse)
Band	11|11 E2	Start	118,927,131 bp
Band	11|11 E2	End	118,931,795 bp
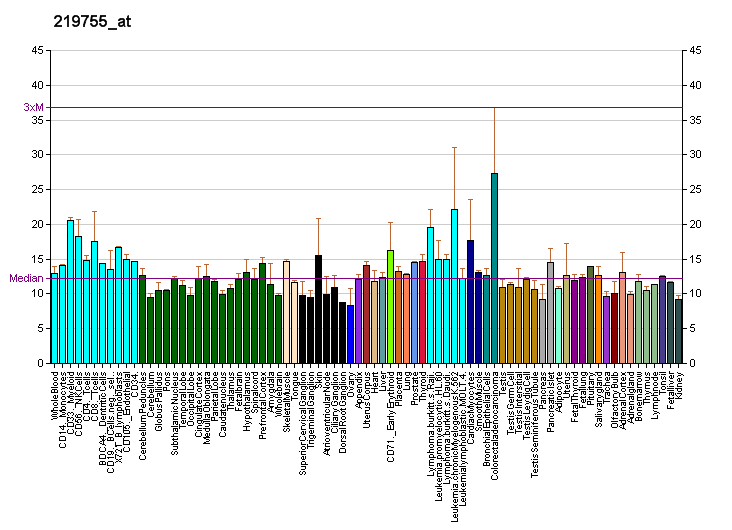
RNA expression pattern
Bgee	Human / Mouse (ortholog); Top expressed in: right uterine tube; gonad; stromal cell of endometrium; right testis; ganglionic eminence; left testis; ventricular zone; apex of heart; granulocyte; right lobe of liver / Top expressed in: granulocyte; respiratory epithelium; olfactory epithelium; Rostral migratory stream; neural layer of retina; thymus; proximal tubule; right kidney; yolk sac; ganglionic eminence; More reference expression data
BioGPS	More reference expression data
Gene ontology
Molecular function	methylated histone binding; protein binding; single-stranded RNA binding; ubiquitin-protein transferase activator activity
Cellular component	ubiquitin ligase complex; nucleoplasm; heterochromatin; PRC1 complex; PcG protein complex; nucleus
Biological process	positive regulation of collagen biosynthetic process; regulation of transcription, DNA-templated; positive regulation of DNA repair; negative regulation of transcription by RNA polymerase II; transcription, DNA-templated; positive regulation of cell population proliferation; regulation of catalytic activity; histone ubiquitination; cellular response to hydrogen peroxide; chromatin organization
Sources:Amigo / QuickGO
Orthologs
Databases	NCBI: entry; OMA: entry
Species	Human	Mouse
Entrez	57332	30951
Ensembl	ENSG00000141570	ENSMUSG00000025578
UniProt	Q9HC52	Q9QXV1
RefSeq (mRNA)	NM_020649	NM_013926
RefSeq (protein)	NP_065700	NP_038954
Location (UCSC)	Chr 17: 79.79 – 79.8 Mb	Chr 11: 118.93 – 118.93 Mb
PubMed search
- Wikidata
View/Edit Human	View/Edit Mouse

Chromobox protein homolog 8 is a protein that in humans is encoded by the CBX8 gene.

== Interactions ==
CBX8 has been shown to interact with RING1 and MLLT1.
