= PHC1 =

Protein-coding gene in the species Homo sapiens

Identifiers
- Aliases: PHC1, EDR1, HPH1, MCPH11, RAE28, polyhomeotic homolog 1
- External IDs: OMIM: 602978; MGI: 103248; GeneCards: PHC1
Available structures
PDB	Ortholog search: PDBe RCSB
PDB	List of PDB id codes 2L8E

Gene location (Human)
Chr.	Chromosome 12 (human)
Band	12p13.31	Start	8,913,896 bp
Band	12p13.31	End	8,941,467 bp

Gene location (Mouse)
Chr.	Chromosome 6 (mouse)
Band	6 F1|6 57.52 cM	Start	122,294,690 bp
Band	6 F1|6 57.52 cM	End	122,317,520 bp
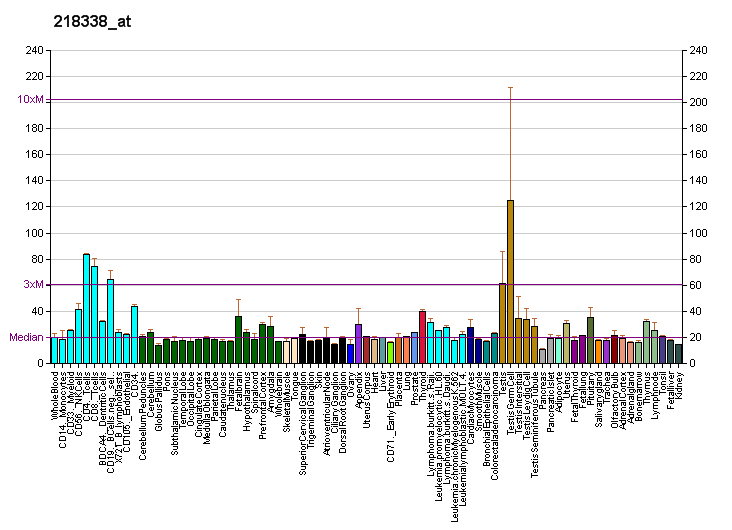
RNA expression pattern
Bgee	Human / Mouse (ortholog); Top expressed in: right uterine tube; anterior pituitary; right hemisphere of cerebellum; ganglionic eminence; ventricular zone; canal of the cervix; body of uterus; left ovary; right lobe of thyroid gland; right testis / Top expressed in: seminiferous tubule; epiblast; genital tubercle; tail of embryo; medulla of thymus; Gonadal ridge; primitive streak; mandibular prominence; maxillary prominence; internal carotid artery; More reference expression data
BioGPS	More reference expression data
Gene ontology
Molecular function	DNA binding; zinc ion binding; metal ion binding; protein binding
Cellular component	PcG protein complex; PRC1 complex; nucleus; nucleoplasm
Biological process	multicellular organism development; histone ubiquitination; negative regulation of G0 to G1 transition
Sources:Amigo / QuickGO
Orthologs
Databases	NCBI: entry; OMA: entry
Species	Human	Mouse
Entrez	1911	13619
Ensembl	ENSG00000111752	ENSMUSG00000040669
UniProt	P78364	Q64028
RefSeq (mRNA)	NM_004426	NM_001042623; NM_001271579; NM_007905; NM_001355215
RefSeq (protein)	NP_004417	NP_001036088; NP_001258508; NP_031931; NP_001342144; NP_001395176 NP_001395177; NP_001395178; NP_001395179
Location (UCSC)	Chr 12: 8.91 – 8.94 Mb	Chr 6: 122.29 – 122.32 Mb
PubMed search
- Wikidata
View/Edit Human	View/Edit Mouse

Polyhomeotic-like protein 1 is a protein that in humans is encoded by the PHC1 gene.

== Structure ==
This gene is a homolog of the Drosophila polyhomeotic gene, which is a member of the Polycomb group of genes. The gene product is a component of a multimeric protein complex that contains EDR2 and the vertebrate Polycomb protein BMI1. The gene product, the EDR2 protein, and the Drosophila polyhomeotic protein share two highly conserved domains, named homology domains I and II. These domains are involved in protein–protein interactions and may mediate heterodimerization of the protein encoded by the PHC1 gene and the EDR2 protein.

== Function ==
PHC1 is a component of a polycomb group (PcG) multiprotein PRC1-like complex which represses the expression of many genes, including Hox genes. It is required for proper control of cellular levels of GMNN expression.

== Clinical significance ==
Mutations in this gene have been associated to cases of primary microcephaly.

== Interactions ==
PHC1 has been shown to interact with BMI1 and PHC2.
