= KDM2B =

Protein-coding gene in humans

Identifiers
- Aliases: KDM2B, CXXC2, FBXL10, Fbl10, JHDM1B, PCCX2, lysine demethylase 2B
- External IDs: OMIM: 609078; MGI: 1354737; GeneCards: KDM2B
Available structures
PDB	Ortholog search: PDBe RCSB
PDB	List of PDB id codes 4O64
Enzyme activity
EC #	BRENDA	ExPASy	KEGG	MetaCyc
1.14.11.27	↗	↗	↗	↗

Gene location (Human)
Chr.	Chromosome 12 (human)
Band	12q24.31	Start	121,429,096 bp
Band	12q24.31	End	121,581,023 bp

Gene location (Mouse)
Chr.	Chromosome 5 (mouse)
Band	5|5 F	Start	123,008,728 bp
Band	5|5 F	End	123,127,886 bp
RNA expression pattern
Bgee	Human / Mouse (ortholog); Top expressed in: skin of arm; mucosa of ileum; buccal mucosa cell; ganglionic eminence; ventricular zone; cerebellar vermis; thymus; epithelium of nasopharynx; monocyte; tibialis anterior muscle / Top expressed in: zygote; ganglionic eminence; primary oocyte; secondary oocyte; spermatocyte; morula; spermatid; mesencephalon; epiblast; neural tube; More reference expression data
BioGPS	n/a
Gene ontology
Molecular function	DNA binding; rRNA binding; zinc ion binding; dioxygenase activity; metal ion binding; histone demethylase activity; protein binding; histone H3-methyl-lysine-36 demethylase activity; RNA binding; oxidoreductase activity; RNA polymerase II cis-regulatory region sequence-specific DNA binding
Cellular component	nucleoplasm; nucleolus; PcG protein complex; nucleus; chromosome
Biological process	negative regulation of neuron apoptotic process; midbrain-hindbrain boundary morphogenesis; regulation of transcription, DNA-templated; lateral ventricle development; histone H2A monoubiquitination; negative regulation of neural precursor cell proliferation; hindbrain development; negative regulation of transcription by RNA polymerase II; transcription, DNA-templated; third ventricle development; positive regulation of cell growth; embryonic camera-type eye morphogenesis; histone H3-K36 demethylation; spermatogenesis; forebrain development; positive regulation of stem cell population maintenance; initiation of neural tube closure; midbrain development; fourth ventricle development; chromatin organization
Sources:Amigo / QuickGO
Orthologs
Databases	NCBI: entry; OMA: entry
Species	Human	Mouse
Entrez	84678	30841
Ensembl	ENSG00000089094	ENSMUSG00000029475
UniProt	Q8NHM5	Q6P1G2
RefSeq (mRNA)	NM_001005366; NM_032590	NM_001003953; NM_001005866; NM_013910; NM_001378863; NM_001378864 NM_001378865
RefSeq (protein)	NP_001005366; NP_115979	NP_001003953; NP_038938; NP_001365792; NP_001365793; NP_001365794
Location (UCSC)	Chr 12: 121.43 – 121.58 Mb	Chr 5: 123.01 – 123.13 Mb
PubMed search
- Wikidata
View/Edit Human	View/Edit Mouse

The human KDM2B gene encodes the protein lysine (K)-specific demethylase 2B.

== Tissue and subcellular distribution ==
KDM2B is broadly and highly expressed in embryonic tissues (especially in the developing central nervous system of vertebrates). Expression of KDM2B is also retained in most organs in adults. The protein is present in the nucleoplasm and is enriched in the nucleolus where it binds the transcribed region of ribosomal RNA to represses the transcription of ribosomal RNA genes which inhibits cell growth and proliferation.

== Structure ==
KDM2B protein has several domains including a JmjC domain that has a histone demethylase activity demethylating trimethylated Lys-4 and dimethylated Lys-36 of histone H3. KDM2B specifically recognizes and bind non-methylated DNA in CpG islands through its ZF-CxxC DNA binding domain. KDM2B consequently recruits the non-canonical polycomb repressive complex 1.1 (ncPRC1) to unmethylated CpG islands via a direct interaction with BCOR and PCGF1 leading to the mono-ubiquitylation of histone H2A on K119 and gene repression.

== Function ==
This gene encodes a member of the F-box protein family which is characterized by an approximately 40 amino acid motif, the F-box. The F-box proteins constitute one of the four subunits of ubiquitin protein ligase complex called SCFs (SKP1-cullin-F-box), which function in phosphorylation-dependent ubiquitination. The F-box proteins are divided into 3 classes: Fbws containing WD-40 domains, Fbls containing leucine-rich repeats, and Fbxs containing either different protein-protein interaction modules or no recognizable motifs. The protein encoded by this gene belongs to the Fbls class. Multiple alternatively spliced transcript variants have been found for this gene, but the full-length nature of some variants has not been determined.

As part of the ncPRC1.1 complex, KDM2B was found to be rapidly and transiently recruited to sites of DNA damage in a PARP1- and TIMELESS-dependent manner to promote mono-ubiquitylation of histone H2A on K119 with concomitant local decrease of H2A levels and an increase of H2A.Z. These events promote transcriptional repression at DNA lesions, double strand break signaling, and homologous recombination repair. The activity of the ncPRC1.1 complex at DNA lesions was necessary for the proper recruitment of the two canonical PRC1 complexes (cPRC1.2 and cPRC1.4), defined by their PCGF subunits, MEL18 and BMI1 respectively. Therefore, recruitment of the ncPRC1.1 complex represents an early and critical regulatory step in homologous recombination repair.

== Clinical significance ==
Loss of KDM2B leads to severe developmental defects (growth defects in the brain, including failure of neural tube closure and craniofacial malformations, hematopoietic development) leading to embryonic lethality
