= L3MBTL2 =

Protein-coding gene in the species Homo sapiens

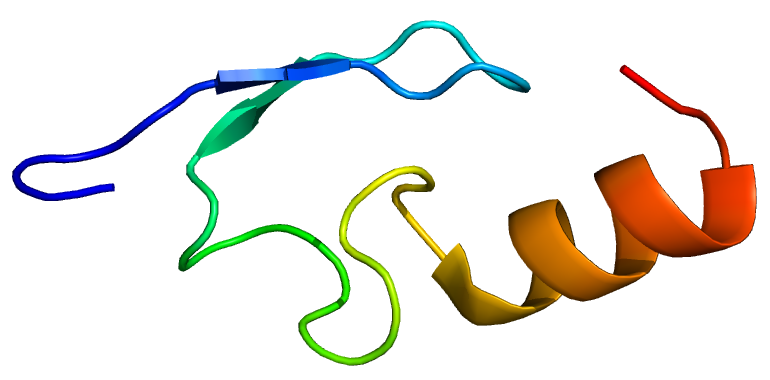
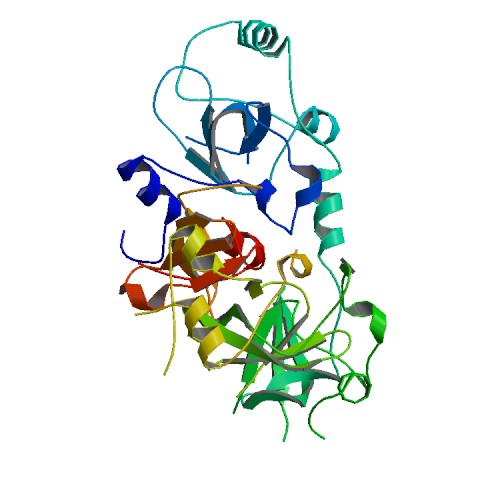
Available structures
PDB	Ortholog search: PDBe RCSB
PDB	List of PDB id codes 2W0T, 3CEY, 3F70

Identifiers
- Aliases: L3MBTL2, H-l(3)mbt-l, L3MBT, L3MBTL2 polycomb repressive complex 1 subunit, polycomb repressive complex 1 subunit, L3MBTL histone methyl-lysine binding protein 2
- External IDs: OMIM: 611865; MGI: 2443584; HomoloGene: 12882; GeneCards: L3MBTL2; OMA:L3MBTL2 - orthologs

Gene location (Human)
Chr.	Chromosome 22 (human)
Band	22q13.2	Start	41,205,282 bp
Band	22q13.2	End	41,231,271 bp

Gene location (Mouse)
Chr.	Chromosome 15 (mouse)
Band	15|15 E1	Start	81,548,090 bp
Band	15|15 E1	End	81,572,516 bp
RNA expression pattern
Bgee	Human / Mouse (ortholog); Top expressed in: pancreatic ductal cell; tibialis anterior muscle; parotid gland; nasal epithelium; skin of arm; mucosa of ileum; cerebellar vermis; external globus pallidus; gingival epithelium; right frontal lobe / Top expressed in: spermatocyte; epiblast; otolith organ; hand; utricle; cumulus cell; superior cervical ganglion; tail of embryo; primary oocyte; seminiferous tubule; More reference expression data
BioGPS	n/a
Gene ontology
Molecular function	histone binding; zinc ion binding; protein binding; metal ion binding; methylated histone binding
Cellular component	nucleus; nucleoplasm
Biological process	regulation of transcription, DNA-templated; transcription, DNA-templated; negative regulation of G0 to G1 transition; chromatin organization
Sources:Amigo / QuickGO
Orthologs
Species	Human	Mouse
Entrez	83746	214669
Ensembl	ENSG00000100395	ENSMUSG00000022394
UniProt	Q969R5	P59178
RefSeq (mRNA)	NM_001003689; NM_031488	NM_001289711; NM_001289712; NM_145993
RefSeq (protein)	NP_113676	NP_001276640; NP_001276641; NP_666105
Location (UCSC)	Chr 22: 41.21 – 41.23 Mb	Chr 15: 81.55 – 81.57 Mb
PubMed search
- Wikidata
View/Edit Human	View/Edit Mouse

Lethal(3)malignant brain tumor-like 2 protein is a protein that in humans is encoded by the L3MBTL2 gene.
