= Louis Tartaglia =

American biochemist, pharmaceutical scientist, and entrepreneur

Louis Anthony Tartaglia
- Born: 1963 (age 62–63); Albany, New York, U.S.
- Education: Ph.D., Biochemistry, UC Berkeley
- Known for: Cloning the leptin receptor, TNF receptor signaling, UCP2 and UCP3 research
- Awards: Coverage in US national media for leptin receptor discovery
- Scientific career
- Fields: Biochemistry, Pharmaceutical science
- Workplaces: Millennium Pharmaceuticals, Genentech, Third Rock Ventures, 5AM Ventures
- Doctoral advisor: Bruce Ames

Louis Anthony Tartaglia is an American biochemist, pharmaceutical scientist, and entrepreneur. As a scientist, he is known for first identifying and cloning the leptin receptor in 1995, a discovery that prompted immediate coverage in US national media given its expected clinical significance. He is also known for studying signaling mechanisms from the tumor necrosis factor (TNF) receptors, and for publishing studies in the fields of obesity and diabetes which are often discussed in subject reviews. After moving from academia to industry in 1990, for over a decade he accompanied the growth of Millennium Pharmaceuticals, reaching top positions within the company. In executive roles at venture capital firms, and as a member of several advisory boards, Tartaglia has helped start a number of therapeutics-oriented companies that have found their way into the market, among them Agios, Editas, Rhythm, and Zafgen.

Tartaglia was born in Albany, New York in 1963.

== Education ==
In 1990, Tartaglia received his Ph.D. in biochemistry from UC Berkeley in the laboratory of professor Bruce Ames. Between 1990 and 1993, he did postdoctoral research in the lab of David Goeddel at Genentech, authoring over 10 original papers in peer-reviewed journals.

== Career ==
In 1993, Tartaglia began his career as the first employee and scientist at Millennium Pharmaceuticals, Inc. He led a lab that cloned and characterized several genes related to obesity and diabetes, which led to over 30 original scientific publications and over 20 patents. Promoted to Vice President of Metabolic Diseases in 1999, he led a team devoted to discovering drug candidates for the firm's pharmaceutical company partners. In 2004, he became Vice President of New Ventures at Millenium. Between 2004 and 2007, he worked in Gene Logic. In 2007, joined a new venture capital firm (Third Rock Ventures) devoted to launching new biotech companies. At this firm, he accompanied the start of companies Agios, Ablexis, Rhythm, Editas, Ember, and Zafgen. In 2016 Tartaglia joined 5AM Ventures to lead their de novo company formation where he oversaw the foundation of companies Entrada and Diagon.

== Research ==
As a Ph.D. student under Bruce Ames at UC Berkeley in 1985, he studied the bacterial defense to oxidants and co-authored half a dozen papers, including an article in Science describing the first known transcription factor to be directly activated by oxidative stress.

During his postdoctoral years at Genentech under David Goeddel, Tartaglia co-authored a dozen papers on TNF (Tumour necrosis factor) receptors, coining the term “Death Domain” to refer to the signaling of programmed cell death; homologous domains were later found in many receptors and signal transduction molecules.

After joining Millennium Pharmaceuticals in 1993, his group soon cloned the receptor for the "obesity hormone" leptin. He published this work in 1995 in an article which was selected in 2004 by Cell among the 16 most “memorable papers” in its 30-year history. Soon after publication in Cell, this discovery was announced on several national press media.

In a collaborative effort with the Whitehead Institute, in 1999, his group identified a small intestinal protein (FA transport protein), which was found to play a key role in the uptake of dietary fat into the body.

Tartaglia's further research went on to clone and characterize mitochondrial uncoupling genes UCP2 and UCP3, in collaboration with colleagues from Prague and Beaverton, Oregon).

== Publications ==
His most cited original research articles are:

- Tartaglia, L.A., Ayres, T.M., Wong, G.H. and Goeddel, D.V., (1993). A novel domain within the 55 kd TNF receptor signals cell death. Cell, 74(5), pp. 845–853. According to Google Scholar, this article has been cited 1657 times.
- L A Tartaglia 1, M Dembski, X Weng, N Deng, J Culpepper, R Devos, G J Richards, L A Campfield, F T Clark, J Deeds, C Muir, S Sanker, A Moriarty, K J Moore, J S Smutko, G G Mays, E A Wool, C A Monroe, R I Tepper. (1995) Identification and expression cloning of a leptin receptor, OB-R. Cell 83(7):1263-71. According to Google Scholar, this article has been cited 4548 times.
- Chen, H., Charlat, O., Tartaglia, L.A., Woolf, E.A., Weng, X., Ellis, S.J., Lakey, N.D., Culpepper, J., More, K.J., Breitbart, R.E. and Duyk, G.M., (1996). Evidence that the diabetes gene encodes the leptin receptor: identification of a mutation in the leptin receptor gene in db/db mice. Cell, 84(3), pp. 491–495. According to Google Scholar, this article has been cited 2512 times.
- Xu H, Barnes GT, Yang Q, Tan G, Yang D, Chou CJ, Sole J, Nichols A, Ross JS, Tartaglia LA, Chen H. (2003) Chronic inflammation in fat plays a crucial role in the development of obesity-related insulin resistance. The Journal of Clinical Investigation 112.12 (2003): 1821-1830. According to Google Scholar, this article has been cited 6809 times.

His most cited subject review articles are:

- Tartaglia, L.A. and Goeddel, D.V., (1992). Two TNF receptors. Immunology today, 13(5), pp. 151–153. According to Google Scholar, this article has been cited 1338 times.
- Tartaglia, L.A., (1997). The leptin receptor. Journal of Biological Chemistry, 272(10), pp. 6093–6096. According to Google Scholar, this article has been cited 1744 times.

== Patents ==
In the industrial milieu, Tartaglia has been granted over 30 patents involving biomedical methods. These include the leptin receptor patent, the screening of UCPH (UCP2) levels to monitor weight disorders, and the administration of melanocortin 4 receptor (MC4R) agonists to certain patients, an approach currently undergoing phase 3 trials, sponsored by the patent assignee, Rhythm Pharmaceuticals.
