= PHC2 =

Protein-coding gene in humans

Identifiers
- Aliases: PHC2, EDR2, HPH2, PH2, polyhomeotic homolog 2
- External IDs: OMIM: 602979; MGI: 1860454; GeneCards: PHC2

Gene location (Human)
Chr.	Chromosome 1 (human)
Band	1p35.1	Start	33,323,623 bp
Band	1p35.1	End	33,431,052 bp

Gene location (Mouse)
Chr.	Chromosome 4 (mouse)
Band	4 D2.2|4 62.12 cM	Start	128,548,495 bp
Band	4 D2.2|4 62.12 cM	End	128,646,674 bp
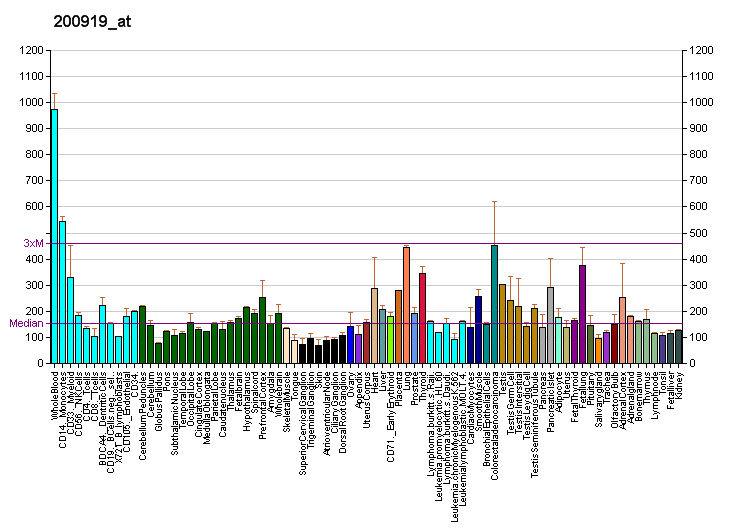
RNA expression pattern
Bgee	Human / Mouse (ortholog); Top expressed in: right lung; tibial arteries; gastric mucosa; tibial nerve; ascending aorta; left coronary artery; ganglionic eminence; upper lobe of left lung; Descending thoracic aorta; left uterine tube / Top expressed in: Rostral migratory stream; external carotid artery; internal carotid artery; ventricular zone; medial ganglionic eminence; genital tubercle; secondary oocyte; zygote; gray matter layer of cerebellum; primary oocyte; More reference expression data
BioGPS	More reference expression data
Gene ontology
Molecular function	DNA binding; protein binding; identical protein binding; metal ion binding; zinc ion binding
Cellular component	heterochromatin; PRC1 complex; PcG protein complex; nucleus; nucleoplasm
Biological process	spermatogenesis; multicellular organism development
Sources:Amigo / QuickGO
Orthologs
Databases	NCBI: entry; OMA: entry
Species	Human	Mouse
Entrez	1912	54383
Ensembl	ENSG00000134686	ENSMUSG00000028796
UniProt	Q8IXK0	Q9QWH1
RefSeq (mRNA)	NM_004427; NM_198040; NM_001330488	NM_001195083; NM_001195130; NM_018774
RefSeq (protein)	NP_001317417; NP_004418; NP_932157	NP_001182012; NP_001182059; NP_061244
Location (UCSC)	Chr 1: 33.32 – 33.43 Mb	Chr 4: 128.55 – 128.65 Mb
PubMed search
- Wikidata
View/Edit Human	View/Edit Mouse

Polyhomeotic-like protein 2 is a protein that in humans is encoded by the PHC2 gene.

== Function ==
In Drosophila melanogaster, the 'Polycomb' group (PcG) of genes are part of a cellular memory system that is responsible for the stable inheritance of gene activity. PcG proteins form a large multimeric, chromatin-associated protein complex. The protein encoded by this gene has homology to the Drosophila PcG protein 'polyhomeotic' (Ph) and is known to heterodimerize with EDR1 and colocalize with BMI1 in interphase nuclei of human cells. The specific function in human cells has not yet been determined. Two transcript variants encoding different isoforms have been found for this gene.

== Interactions ==
PHC2 has been shown to interact with MAPKAPK2, PHC1, BMI1 and MCRS1.
