= RING1 =

Protein-coding gene in the species Homo sapiens

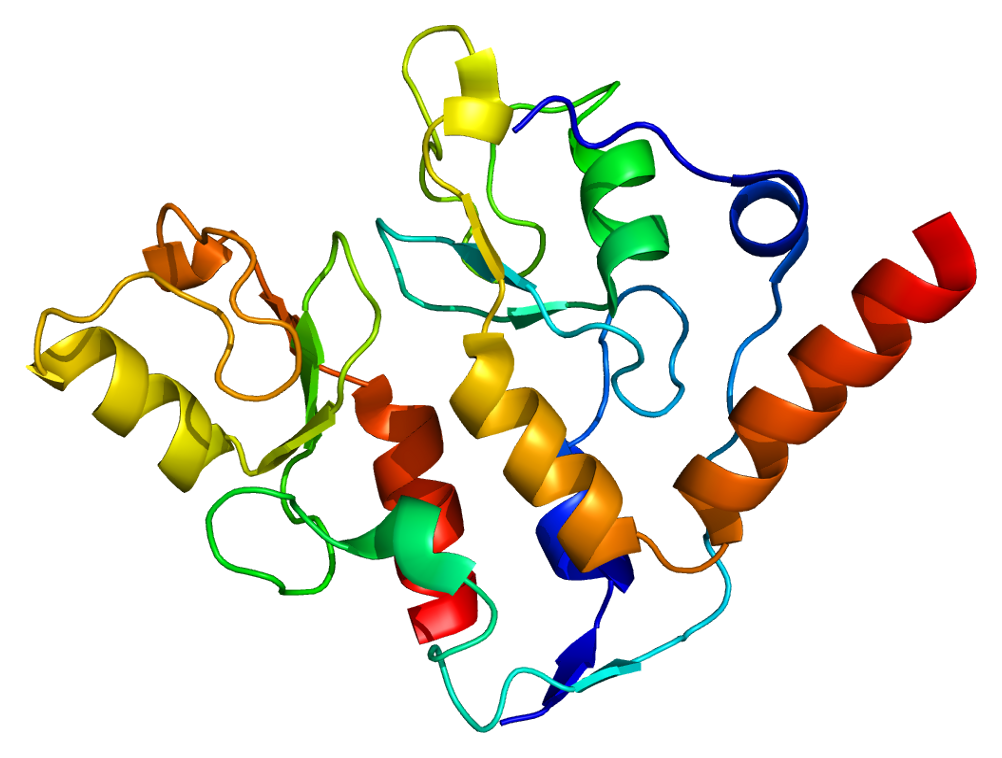

Identifiers
- Aliases: RING1, RING1A, RNF1, ring finger protein 1
- External IDs: OMIM: 602045; MGI: 1101770; GeneCards: RING1
Enzyme activity
EC #	BRENDA	ExPASy	KEGG	MetaCyc
2.3.2.27	↗	↗	↗	↗

Gene location (Human)
Chr.	Chromosome 6 (human)
Band	6p21.32	Start	33,208,500 bp
Band	6p21.32	End	33,212,722 bp

Gene location (Mouse)
Chr.	Chromosome 17 (mouse)
Band	17|17 B1	Start	34,239,766 bp
Band	17|17 B1	End	34,243,654 bp
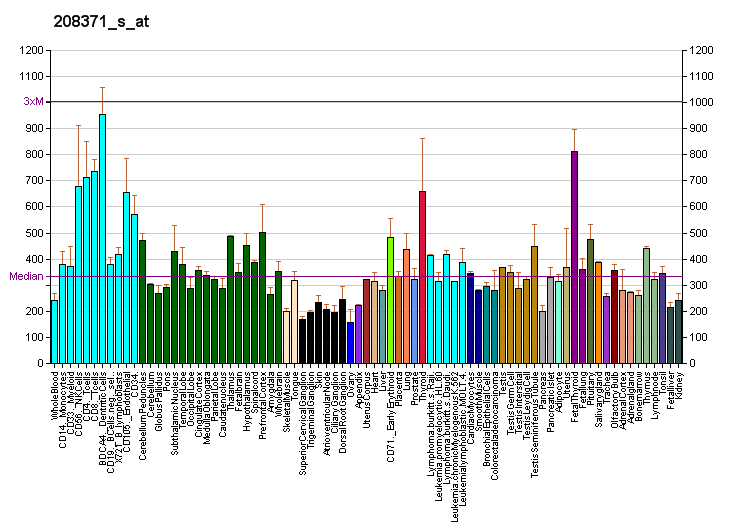

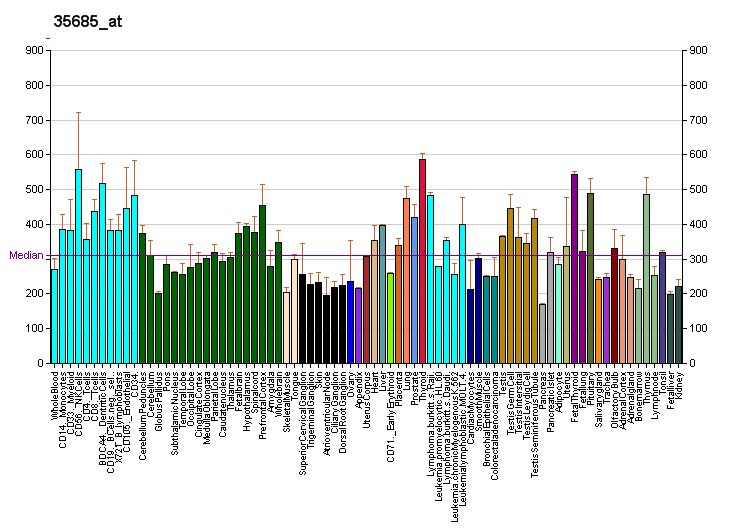
RNA expression pattern
Bgee	Human / Mouse (ortholog); Top expressed in: pituitary gland; anterior pituitary; right lobe of thyroid gland; left lobe of thyroid gland; right hemisphere of cerebellum; right uterine tube; canal of the cervix; left ovary; body of uterus; right ovary / Top expressed in: neural layer of retina; ascending aorta; muscle of thigh; aortic valve; yolk sac; female urethra; granulocyte; lip; parotid gland; ventricular zone; More reference expression data
BioGPS	More reference expression data
Gene ontology
Molecular function	chromatin binding; metal ion binding; protein binding; ubiquitin-protein transferase activator activity; transferase activity
Cellular component	nuclear speck; nuclear body; sex chromatin; ubiquitin ligase complex; nucleoplasm; PcG protein complex; nucleus; cytosol; PRC1 complex
Biological process	regulation of transcription, DNA-templated; histone H2A monoubiquitination; transcription, DNA-templated; protein ubiquitination; regulation of catalytic activity; negative regulation of transcription, DNA-templated; histone ubiquitination; camera-type eye morphogenesis; anterior/posterior pattern specification; negative regulation of G0 to G1 transition; chromatin organization
Sources:Amigo / QuickGO
Orthologs
Databases	NCBI: entry; OMA: entry
Species	Human	Mouse
Entrez	6015	19763
Ensembl	ENSG00000204227	ENSMUSG00000024325
UniProt	Q06587	O35730
RefSeq (mRNA)	NM_002931	NM_009066
RefSeq (protein)	NP_002922	NP_033092
Location (UCSC)	Chr 6: 33.21 – 33.21 Mb	Chr 17: 34.24 – 34.24 Mb
PubMed search
- Wikidata
View/Edit Human	View/Edit Mouse

E3 ubiquitin-protein ligase RING1 is an enzyme that in humans is encoded by the RING1 gene.

== Function ==
This gene belongs to the RING finger family, members of which encode proteins characterized by a RING domain, a zinc-binding motif related to the zinc finger domain. The gene product can bind DNA and can act as a transcriptional repressor. It is associated with the multimeric polycomb group protein complex. The gene product interacts with the polycomb group proteins BMI1, EDR1, and CBX4, and colocalizes with these proteins in large nuclear domains. It interacts with the CBX4 protein via its glycine-rich C-terminal domain. The gene maps to the HLA class II region, where it is contiguous with the RING finger genes FABGL and HKE4.

== Interactions ==
RING1 has been shown to interact with CBX8, BMI1 and RYBP.
