= Bivalent chromatin =

Bivalent chromatin are segments of DNA, bound to histone proteins, that have both repressing and activating epigenetic regulators in the same region. These regulators work to enhance or silence the expression of genes. Since these regulators work in opposition to each other, they normally interact with chromatin at different times. However, in bivalent chromatin, both types of regulators are interacting with the same domain at the same time. Bivalent chromatin domains are normally associated with promoters of transcription factor genes that are expressed at low levels. Bivalent domains have also been found to play a role in developmental regulation in pluripotent embryonic stems cells, gene imprinting and cancer.

== Bivalent epigenetic regulators ==
The most common antagonistic epigenetic regulators found together on bivalent chromatin domains are methylation marks on histone 3 lysine 4 (H3K4me3) and histone 3 lysine 27 (H3K27me3). The H3K27me3 mark silences the gene while the H3K4me3 mark allows the gene to not be permanently silenced, and activated when needed. Embryonic stem cells and imprinted genes are associated with both activating (H3K4me3) and repressive (H3K27me3) marks, as they allow a gene to be repressed until activation is needed. Although there is abundant evidence for co-localization of H3K4me3 and H3K27me3 at the same location in the genome, most evidence suggests that they do not occur on the same molecule but may occur on different copies of histone H3 within the same nucleosome.

== Embryonic stem cells and development ==
Bivalent chromatin domains are found in embryonic stem (ES) cells and play an important role in cell differentiation. When keeping an ES cell in its undifferentiated state, bivalent domains of DNA are used to silence developmental genes that would activate cell differentiation, while keeping the genes poised and ready to be activated. When an ES cell receives a signal to differentiate into a specified cell lineage, activation of the specific developmental genes are needed for differentiation. The developmental genes needed will be activated and the other genes that are not required for that cell lineage will be repressed through their bivalent domains.

H3K4me3 and H3K27me3 marks found on the bivalent domains regulate whether or not an embryonic stem cell differentiates or remains unspecified (pluripotent state). The epigenetic marks contribute to the expression of some genes, and silencing of others during pluripotency and differentiation. H3K27me3 marks repress developmental control genes and stop the cell from differentiating, to ensure that the cell maintains pluripotency. Although this mark represses the lineage control genes, it does keep them ready for activation upon differentiation. When the cell receives the signal to differentiate to a specific type of cell, H3K27me3 will be removed from the genes needed for differentiation, while H3K27me3 maintains repression of developmental control genes that are unnecessary for the chosen lineage. The developmentally regulated process of resolving bivalent chromatin is aided by the activity of ATP-chromatin remodelers such as SWI/SNF, which hydrolyze ATP to evict Polycomb-group proteins from bivalent chromatin.

Only a specific subset of regulators will be activated by H3K4me3 to give a certain cell lineage. This mark activates developmental regulators upon differentiation, and makes the genes needed for differentiation more efficient. Having the activating H3K4me3 mark protects genes from being silenced permanently by repelling transcription repressors and blocking repressive DNA methylation.

Once the cell has differentiated to a specific type of cell only one of the marks remain associated with the chromatin.

== Imprinting ==
Imprinting is the process by which one parental allele is silenced while the allele from the other parent is expressed. The human GRB10 gene displays imprinted gene expression, and in mice, this imprinted Grb10 expression is enabled by the presence of bivalent chromatin. The Grb10 gene in mice has a bivalent domain that uses H3K4me3 and H3K27me3 modifications as a tool to express genes from one parent while the other is silenced. This allows the gene to be expressed by only one parent in a specific tissue. In most somatic tissues, the Grb10 gene is expressed from the maternal allele, except in the brain where it is expressed from the paternal allele. H3K4me3 and H3K27me3 marks are used on the paternal allele of the gene to keep it silenced in all tissues except the brain. The same methylation marks are used on the maternal allele of the gene in brain tissue. When the genes are being expressed the H3K27me3 repressive mark is removed from the bivalent domain.
