= Gian Gaetano Tartaglia =

Italian biochemist and biologist (born 1976)

Gian Gaetano Tartaglia (born 23 October 1976, Rome) is an Italian biophysicist and computational biologist. He is currently a Principal Investigator at the Italian Institute of Technology.

== Biography ==
After a PhD in biochemistry at the University of Zurich and a postdoc at the University of Cambridge in the chemistry department, in 2010 Gian Tartaglia became PI at the Centre for Genomic Regulation (CRG) in Barcelona. He was awarded a European Research Council grant in 2013 for his studies on the role of coding and non-coding transcripts in the regulation of amyloid genes (ERC 309545). In 2014 Tartaglia was tenured in Catalonia as a professor of Life and Medical Sciences . In December 2018, Tartaglia became a full professor of biochemistry in the Department of Biology at University La Sapienza through a procedure of "chiara fama". In 2019 he started working at the Italian Institute of Technology (IIT) as a PI. In 2020, Tartaglia was awarded another ERC grant for the study on the composition of phase-separated assemblies.

== Research ==
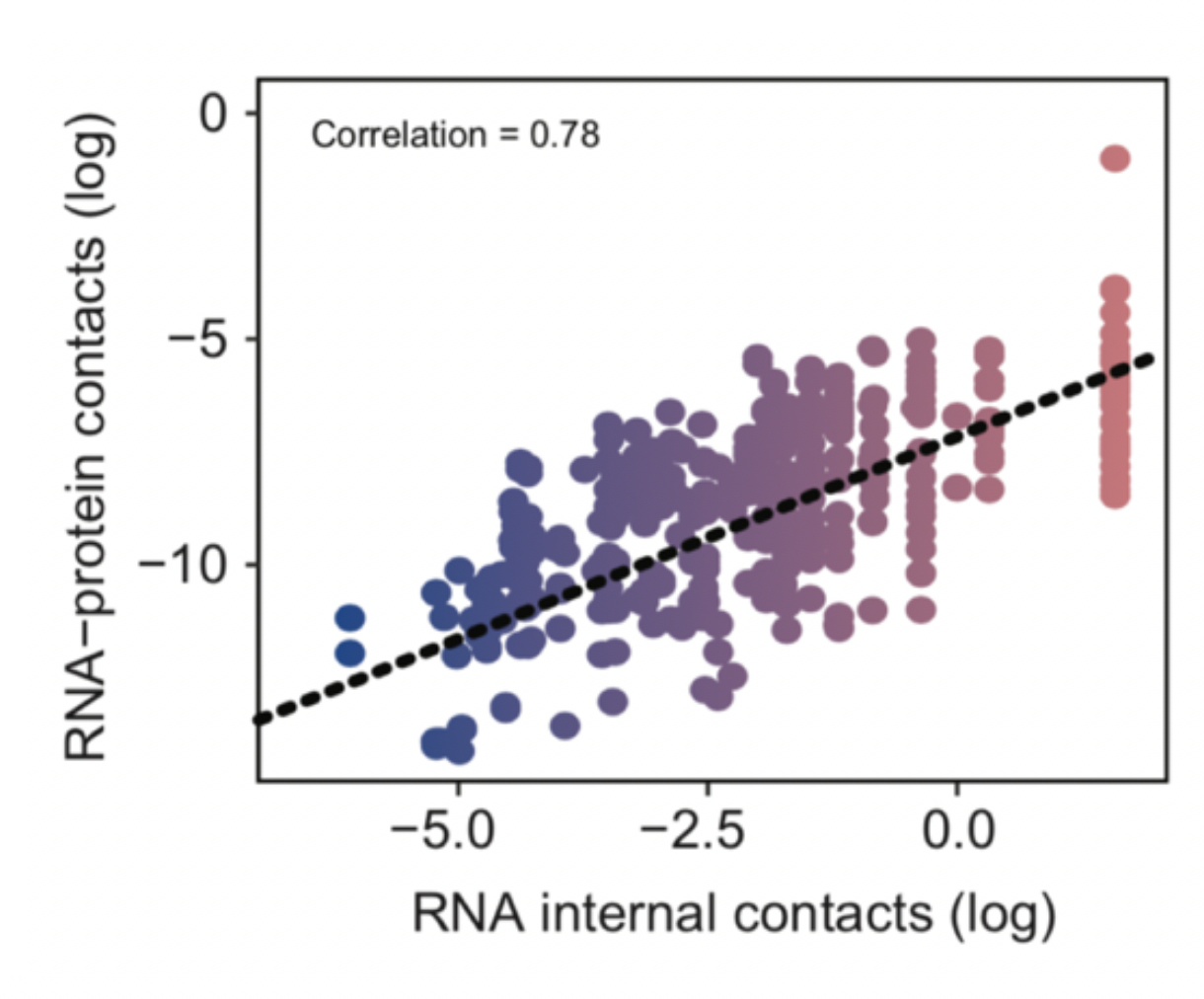
The Tartaglia lab observed that the structural content in RNA molecules is correlated to the number of protein interactions. This reveals the existence of a regulation level that directly links RNA to proteins especially for genes that are highly active in cellular processes.

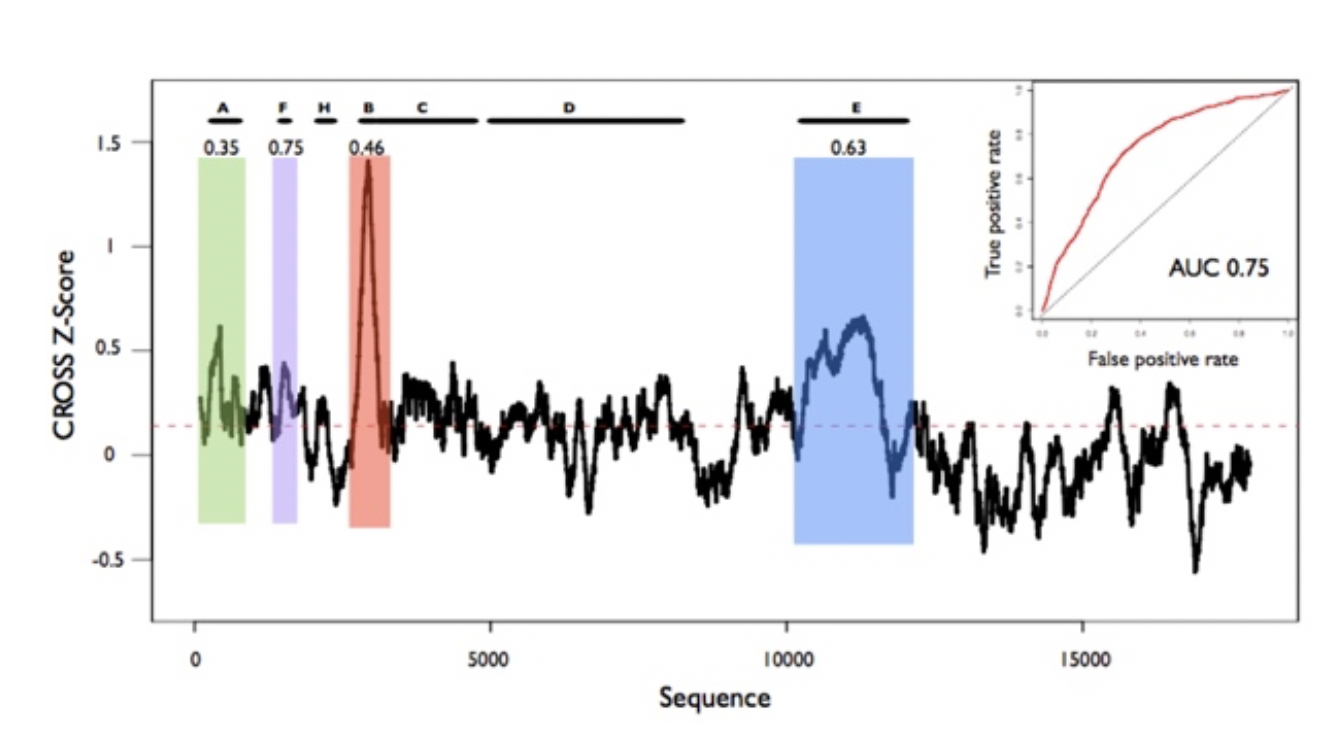
The lab developed the CROSS method to compute the secondary structure profile of large transcripts. Positive scores indicate double-stranded regions, while negative values are predicted to be single-stranded. Predictions for murine XIST are shown (repetitive regions are marked with coloured boxes). The area under the ROC curve of 0.75 (inset) indicates high agreement with experimental data, and correlations with individual domains are reported.

=== Recent discoveries ===
Since 2020, the group has worked on developing RNA aptamers. The lab discovered that these molecules can be used to detect aggregates and have the potential to inhibit progressive accumulation of TDP-43. There is potential for two major applications: diagnostics (i.e., identification of aggregates at the early stages) and therapeutics (i.e., intervention on aggregate development) in the context of Amyotrophic Lateral Sclerosis.

=== Early contributions ===
In 2019, Tartaglia's group discovered that RNA plays a central role in protein assembly. They found that FMR1 mRNA and Xist non-coding RNA are able to trigger the formation of large phase-separated assemblies, while other transcripts such as HSP70 mRNA can prevent the aggregation of specific proteins acting as 'solubilizers'. These observations strongly indicate that RNA-based molecules may be ideal candidates for the stabilisation of proteins in their native conformation by emulating the natural binding partners. The Tartaglia lab found that messenger RNA is a potent solubilizer, blocking the formation of toxic aggregates that are potentially toxic to our organisms.

==== Discovering the interactions of long non-coding RNAs ====
In 2011, Tartaglia's group introduced a method to perform large-scale predictions of protein-RNA associations, discovering the interactions of long non-coding RNA. The algorithm, "Fast predictions of RNA and protein interactions and domains at the Center for Genomic Regulation, Barcelona, Catalonia," or "catRAPID," evaluates the interaction propensities of polypeptide and nucleotide chains using their physicochemical properties. The algorithm shows performances comparable to experimental tools.

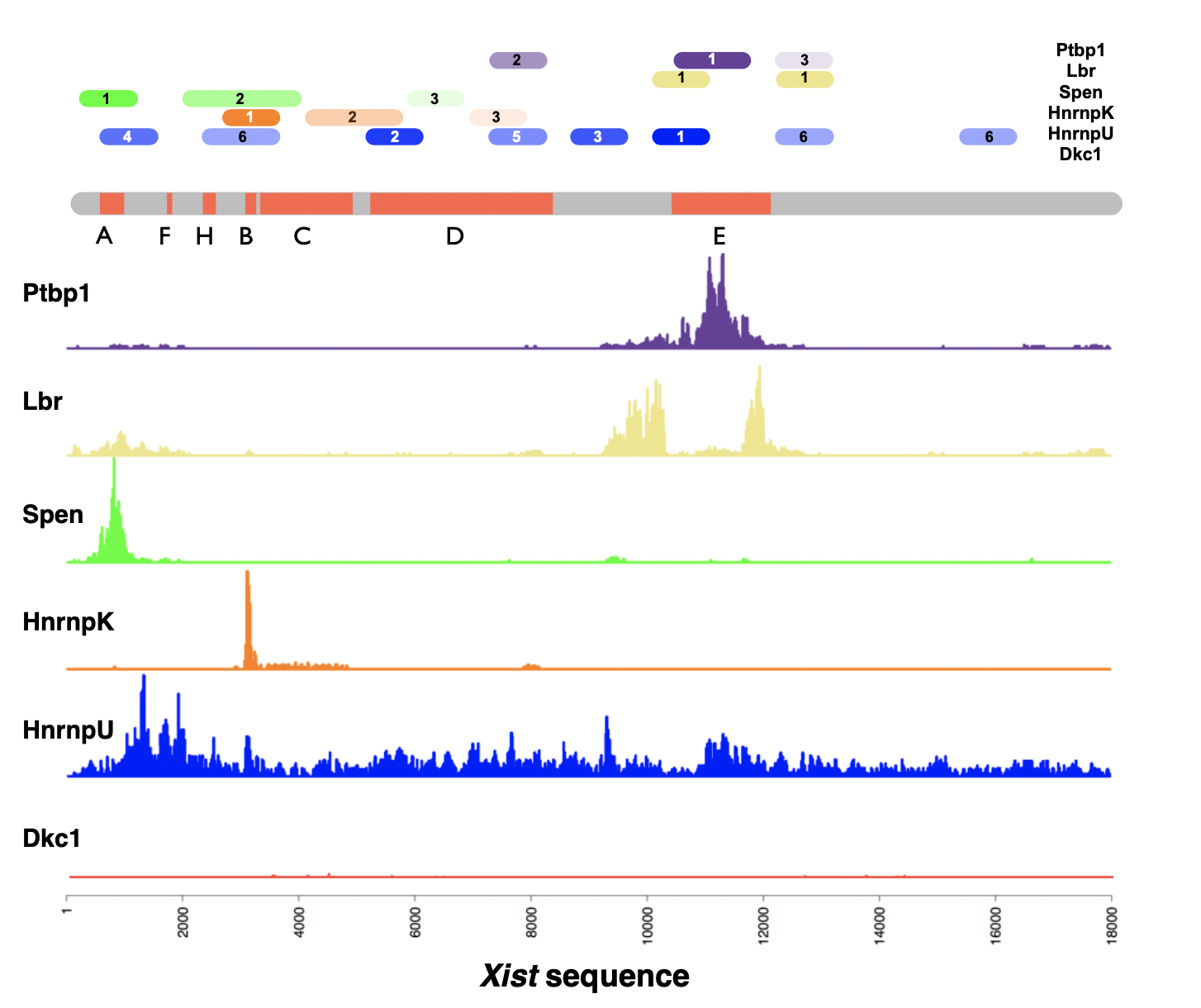
The lab developed the catRAPID method to identify protein partners of non-coding transcripts such as XIST (18000 nt). Top: Predicted binding regions of different proteins, including PTBP1, LBR, SPEN, HNRNPK, HNRNPU, and DKC1 (ranked by interaction propensity); Bottom: eCLIP validation of the binding regions. Protein DKC1 is used as a negative control.

==== Solubility as an engine of evolution ====
During 2007–2010, Tartaglia investigated the relationship between expression and solubility of genes. He found a close link between mRNA expression levels and protein aggregation rates. The original observations were published in Trends in Biological Science Solubility as an engine of evolution. An experimental follow up was published in Journal of the American Chemical Society. Based on the experimental results, he developed an approach for prediction of heterologous expression in E. coli.

==== Rationalizing the determinants of protein aggregation ====
Between 2009 and 2012, Tartaglia studied the toxicity of protein aggregates in the cellular context and determined the fraction of the proteome that interacts with insoluble aggregates. He also studied interactions with molecular chaperones and their role in preventing aggregation.

In 2008, Tartaglia developed a method to predict the kinetics of aggregation under a variety of environmental conditions. For several years, the method was one of the top cited articles in the Journal of Molecular Biology. Importantly, Tartaglia used the algorithm to design protein toxins that were expressed in the central nervous system of D. melanogaster.

In 2004–2005, Tartaglia developed the first parameter-free set of equations to predict aggregation rates of proteins using physicochemical properties. The method reproduces the changes of aggregation rates observed in vitro for a large set of peptides and proteins, including those associated with neurological disease.

== Key publications ==
- May 2019 Phase separation drives X-chromosome inactivation: a hypothesis – Cerase, Armaos, Neumayer, Avner, Guttman, Tartaglia
- July 2019 RNA structure drives interaction with proteins – Sanchez de Groot, Armaos, Graña -Montes, Alriquet, Calloni, Vabulas, Tartaglia
- Dec 2018 An Integrative Study of Protein-RNA Condensates Identifies Scaffolding RNAs and Reveals Players in Fragile X- Associated Tremor/Ataxia Syndrome – Cid-Samper, Gelabert-Baldrich, Lang, Lorenzo-Gotor, Ponti, Severijnen, Bolognesi, Gelpi, Hukema, Botta-Orfila, Tartaglia
- Dec 2016 Quantitative predictions of protein interactions with long noncoding RNAs' – Cirillo, Blanco, Armaos, Buness, Avner, Guttman, Cerase, Tartaglia
- May 2011 Predicting protein associations with long noncoding RNAs – Bellucci, Agostini, Masin, Tartaglia
