= Takeda Oncology =

Oncology Division of Takeda Pharmaceuticals

- Type: Subsidiary
- Industry: Biotechnology, Pharmaceutical Company
- Founded: 1993
- Defunct: N/A
- Headquarters: Cambridge, MA, United States
- Key people: Christophe Bianchi, President
- Products: Velcade (bortezomib) for injection
- Number of employees: 1200 (approx.)
- Parent: Takeda Pharmaceutical Company
- Website: www.takedaoncology.com

Takeda Oncology (originally Millennium Pharmaceuticals) is a biopharmaceutical company based in Cambridge, Massachusetts. It is a fully owned subsidiary of Takeda Pharmaceutical.

Takeda Oncology's research, development and commercialization activities focused in two therapeutic areas: oncology and inflammation to develop a line of new product candidates. It was one of the first companies to systematically search for genes linked to disease, although none of the drugs which it is marketing or has in clinical trial, with one partial exception, have been the results of that research.

It is particularly known for bringing bortezomib (marketed as Velcade) through clinical trials to approval for treatment of patients with multiple myeloma by the U.S. FDA, but has a growing clinical development pipeline of other product candidates.

On May 14, 2008, Japanese company Takeda Pharmaceutical announced the completion of its acquisition of Millennium for US$25.00 per share in cash—a deal worth $8.8 billion. Takeda completed the acquisition through a tender offer and subsequent merger as a wholly owned subsidiary Millennium: The Takeda Oncology Company - with the name being simplified to Takeda Oncology in 2013.

== History ==
Millennium was founded by Mark J. Levin, CEO, in Cambridge, Massachusetts in 1993. In its early years, Millennium focused on building science and business teams. Beginning in 1994, Millennium created more than 20 strategic alliances with pharmaceutical and biotechnology companies. These alliances provided Millennium with close to $2 billion of committed funding that was used to develop and enhance its pipeline.

A merger with Leukosite in 1999 brought the company its first drug close-to-market, Campath (alemtuzumab) Injection, and additional investigational drugs in clinical trials. In 2000, a merger with Cambridge Discovery Chemistry gave Millennium a strong presence in the United Kingdom and added to the organization more than 100 scientists with expertise in chemistry. In a strategic business decision, Campath was later sold to the Millennium partner for the drug, ILEX Oncology, which in turn was acquired by Genzyme.

In February 2002, there was a further merger with COR Therapeutics—among the largest such mergers in the history of the biotech industry at that time. In addition to creating a strong pipeline of novel therapeutics, the merger added cardiovascular research and drug development to the company's other key therapeutic areas: oncology and inflammation. The merger also brought Integrilin (eptifibatide) Injection, an intravenous anti-platelet drug for patients with severe cardiovascular diseases, into the Millennium fold. Millennium partnered with Schering-Plough on the development and marketing of Integrilin until 2005 when Millennium licensed the exclusive U.S. commercialization and development rights of Integrilin to Schering-Plough.

In May 2003 Velcade was launched for the treatment of relapsed and refractory multiple myeloma – a cancer of the blood. At the time, the U.S. Food and Drug Administration (FDA) granted approval for the treatment of multiple myeloma for patients who had not responded to at least two other therapies for the disease. Velcade — the first FDA-approved proteasome inhibitor — reached the market in record time and represented the first treatment in more than a decade to be approved for patients with multiple myeloma.

In late December 2007, Millennium successfully submitted a supplemental new drug application (sNDA) to the FDA for Velcade for previously untreated multiple myeloma. The sNDA submitted to the FDA for this indication included data from the Phase III VISTA study, a large, well-controlled international clinical trial, comparing a Velcade-based regimen to a traditional standard of care. Priority review was granted by the FDA in January 2008. On June 20, 2008, the FDA approved VELCADE in combination for patients with previously untreated multiple myeloma. This means that Millennium can market Velcade to patients who have not had any prior therapies for multiple myeloma (a first-line therapy).

In May 2008, Takeda Pharmaceutical Company Limited purchased Millennium for $8.8 billion. Millennium began operating as an independent subsidiary under its new name "Millennium: The Takeda Oncology Company". It acts as Takeda's global oncology hub from Cambridge, MA, while Takeda also has oncology facilities in San Diego, San Francisco, Tsukuba and Osaka.

In 2014, Takeda dropped the "Millennium" brand; effectively renaming the subsidiary into Takeda Oncology. However, Millennium Pharmaceuticals Inc is still a legal holding of Takeda and its name is still used for on-going legal processes.

In October 2023, Takeda began the process of withdrawing its drug, Exkivity in the United States after ending a trial for the drug early due to failure in the late-stage study. Exkivity is a drug for adults with non-small cell lung cancer. The FDA granted approval for the trial in 2021.

== Products ==
Product Portfolio
Brand Name	Drug Name(s)	Indication	Date Approved in USA	Partner
VELCADE	bortezomib	Velcade is indicated for the front-line treatment of multiple myeloma and for patients with mantle cell lymphoma who have received at least 1 prior therapy.	05-13-2003	Ortho Biotech and Janssen-Cilag, members of the Johnson & Johnson Family of Companies, are responsible for commercialization of VELCADE in Europe and the rest of the world.
MEPACT	mifamurtide	Mifamurtide is a drug against osteosarcoma, a kind of bone cancer mainly affecting children and young adults, which is lethal in about a third of cases.	March 2009	N/A
ADCETRIS	brentuximab vedotin	Adcetris is an antibody-drug conjugate approved to treat anaplastic large cell lymphoma (ALCL) and Hodgkin lymphoma.	10-31-2012	Seattle Genetics is responsible for commercialization of ADCETRIS in the United States, and Takeda Oncology is responsible in Europe and the rest of the world.
NINLARO	Ixazomib	The first oral proteasome inhibitor to treat multiple myeloma	November 2015	

Velcade is the first oncology drug marketed and promoted by Millennium. Velcade was granted FDA approval little more than four and a half years after initiation of the first clinical trial. To discover and develop such treatments, the Company focuses on key molecular pathways that play crucial roles in underlying disease processes, and on identifying therapeutically significant differences that may exist among people. Takeda Oncology applies this approach broadly throughout its R&D program to develop novel treatments not just for cancer but also for a number of other important diseases.

Velcade was co-developed by Millennium Pharmaceuticals. and Johnson & Johnson Pharmaceutical Research & Development. Takeda is responsible for commercialization of Velcade in the U.S. and Janssen-Cilag is responsible for commercialization in Europe and the rest of the world. Janssen Pharmaceutical K.K. is responsible for commercialization in Japan. For a limited period of time, Takeda and Ortho Biotech. are co- promoting Velcade in the U.S. Approved in 85 countries, at least 85,000 patients have been treated with Velcade globally.
