= Cancer stem cell =

Cancer cells with features of normal cells

Figure 1: Stem cell specific and conventional cancer therapies.

Cancer stem cells (CSCs) are cancer cells (found within tumors or hematological cancers) that possess characteristics associated with normal stem cells, specifically the ability to give rise to all cell types found in a particular cancer sample. CSCs are therefore tumorigenic (tumor-forming), perhaps in contrast to other non-tumorigenic cancer cells. CSCs may generate tumors through the stem cell processes of self-renewal and differentiation into multiple cell types. Such cells are hypothesized to persist in tumors as a distinct population and cause relapse and metastasis by giving rise to new tumors. Therefore, development of specific therapies targeted at CSCs holds hope for improvement of survival and quality of life of cancer patients, especially for patients with metastatic disease.

Existing cancer treatments have mostly been developed based on animal models, where therapies able to promote tumor shrinkage were deemed effective. However, animals do not provide a complete model of human disease. In particular, in mice, whose life spans do not exceed two years, tumor relapse is difficult to study.

The efficacy of cancer treatments is, in the initial stages of testing, often measured by the ablation fraction of tumor mass (fractional kill). As CSCs form a small proportion of the tumor, this may not necessarily select for drugs that act specifically on the stem cells. The theory suggests that conventional chemotherapies kill differentiated or differentiating cells, which form the bulk of the tumor but do not generate new cells. A population of CSCs, which gave rise to it, could remain untouched and cause relapse.

Cancer stem cells were first identified by John Dick in acute myeloid leukemia in the late 1990s. Since the early 2000s they have been an intense cancer research focus. The term itself was coined in a highly cited paper in 2001 by biologists Tannishtha Reya, Sean J. Morrison, Michael F. Clarke and Irving Weissman.

== Tumor propagation models ==
In different tumor subtypes, cells within the tumor population exhibit functional heterogeneity and tumors are formed from cells with various proliferative and differentiation capacities. This functional heterogeneity among cancer cells has led to the creation of multiple propagation models to account for heterogeneity and differences in tumor-regenerative capacity: the cancer stem cell (CSC) and stochastic model. However, certain perspectives maintain that this demarcation is artificial, since both processes act in complementary manners as far as actual tumor populations are concerned. Importantly it is observed that whereas in the healthy human esophageal epithelium the proliferative burden is met by a stochastically dividing basal epithelium. Upon its transition to the precancerous Barrett's esophagus epithelium, however, a small dedicated stem cell compartment appears that supports proliferation of the epithelium while concomitantly evidence for a stochastically dividing compartment contributing to the maintenance of the tissue disappears. Hence, at least for certain neoplastic tissues, dedicated stem cell compartments maintain and enlarge the size of the transformed compartment

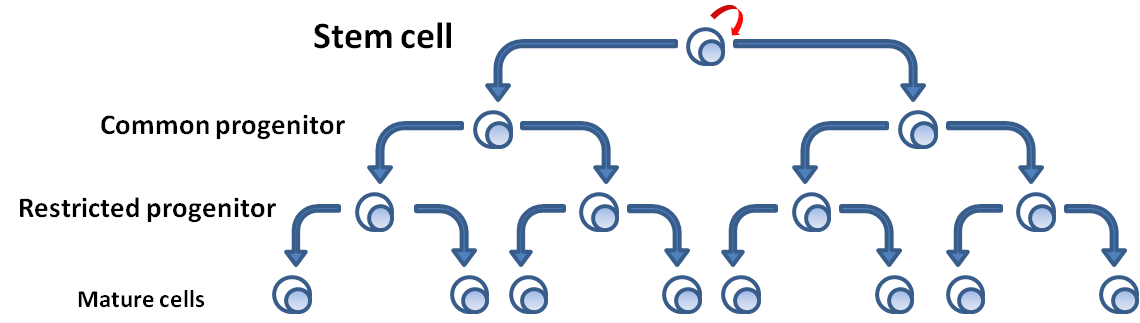
Figure 2: A normal cellular hierarchy comprising stem cells at the apex, which generate common and more restricted progenitor cells and ultimately the mature cell types that constitute particular tissues.

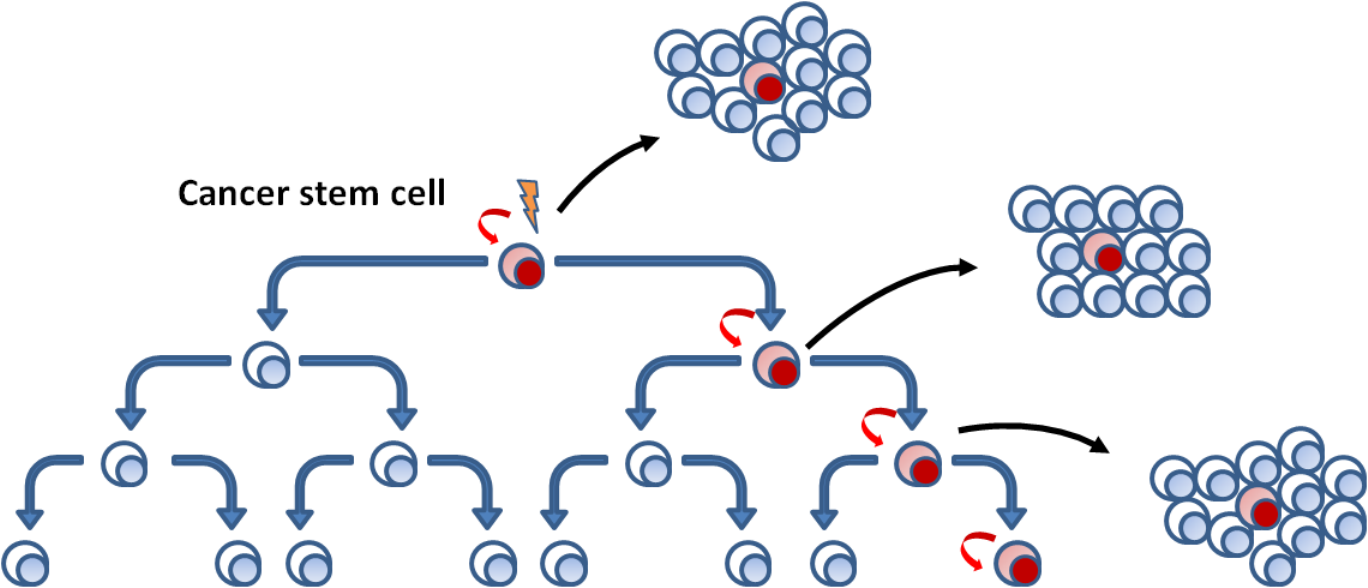
Figure 3. In the cancer stem cell (CSC) model, only the CSCs have the ability to generate a tumor, based on their self-renewal properties and proliferative potential.

=== The cancer stem cell model ===
The cancer stem cell model, also known as the Hierarchical Model proposes that tumors are hierarchically organized (CSCs lying at the apex (Fig. 3).) Within the cancer population of the tumors there are cancer stem cells (CSC) that are tumorigenic cells and are biologically distinct from other subpopulations They have two defining features: their long-term ability to self-renew and their capacity to differentiate into progeny that is non-tumorigenic but still contributes to the growth of the tumor. This model suggests that only certain subpopulations of cancer stem cells have the ability to drive the progression of cancer, meaning that there are specific (intrinsic) characteristics that can be identified and then targeted to destroy a tumor long-term without the need to battle the whole tumor.

=== Stochastic model ===
In order for a cell to become cancerous it must undergo a significant number of alterations to its DNA sequence. This cell model suggests these mutations could occur to any cell in the body resulting in a cancer. Essentially this theory proposes that all cells have the ability to be tumorigenic making all tumor cells equipotent with the ability to self-renew or differentiate, leading to tumor heterogeneity while others can differentiate into non-CSCs The cell's potential can be influenced by unpredicted genetic or epigenetic factors, resulting in phenotypically diverse cells in both the tumorigenic and non-tumorigenic cells that compose the tumor. According to the "stochastic model" (or "clonal evolution model") every cancer cell in a tumor could gain the ability to self-renew and differentiate to the numerous and heterogeneous lineages of cancer cells that compromise a tumor

These mutations could progressively accumulate and enhance the resistance and fitness of cells that allow them to outcompete other tumor cells, better known as the somatic evolution model. The clonal evolution model, which occurs in both the CSC model and stochastic model, postulates that mutant tumor cells with a growth advantage outproliferate others. Cells in the dominant population have a similar potential for initiating tumor growth. (Fig. 4).

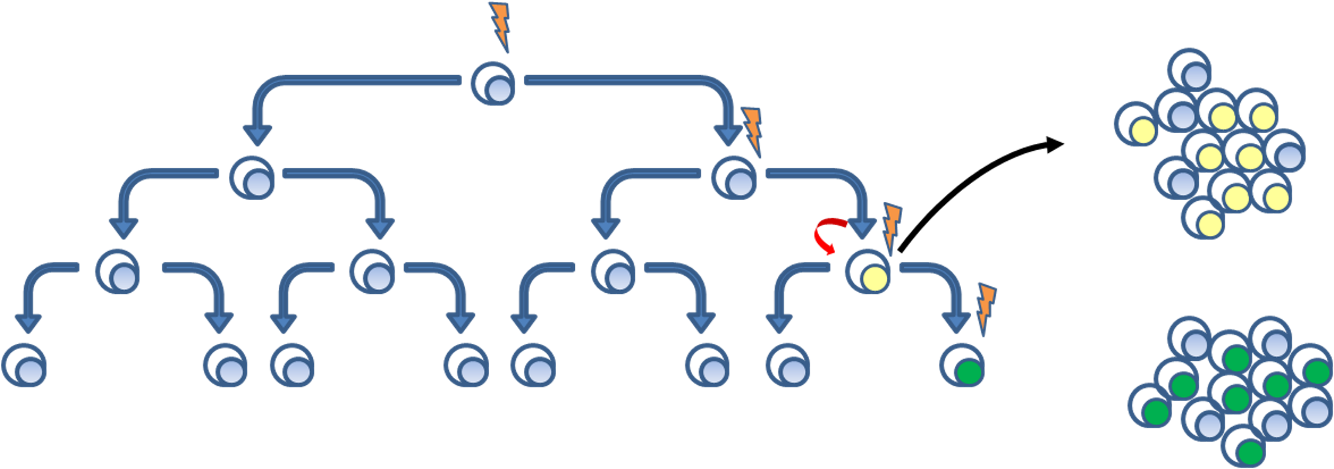
Figure 4: In the clonal evolution model, all undifferentiated cells have similar possibility to change into a tumorigenic cell.

These two models are not mutually exclusive, as CSCs themselves undergo clonal evolution. Thus, the secondary more dominant CSCs may emerge, if a mutation confers more aggressive properties (Fig. 5).

=== Tying CSC and stochastic models together ===
A study in 2014 argues the gap between these two controversial models can be bridged by providing an alternative explanation of tumor heterogeneity. They demonstrate a model that includes aspects of both the "Dreamy" and BULL CSC models. They examined cancer stem cell plasticity in which cancer stem cells can transition between non-cancer stem cells (Non-CSC) and CSC via in situ supporting a more Stochastic model. But the existence of both biologically distinct non-CSC and CSC populations supports a more CSC model, proposing that both models may play a vital role in tumor heterogeneity.

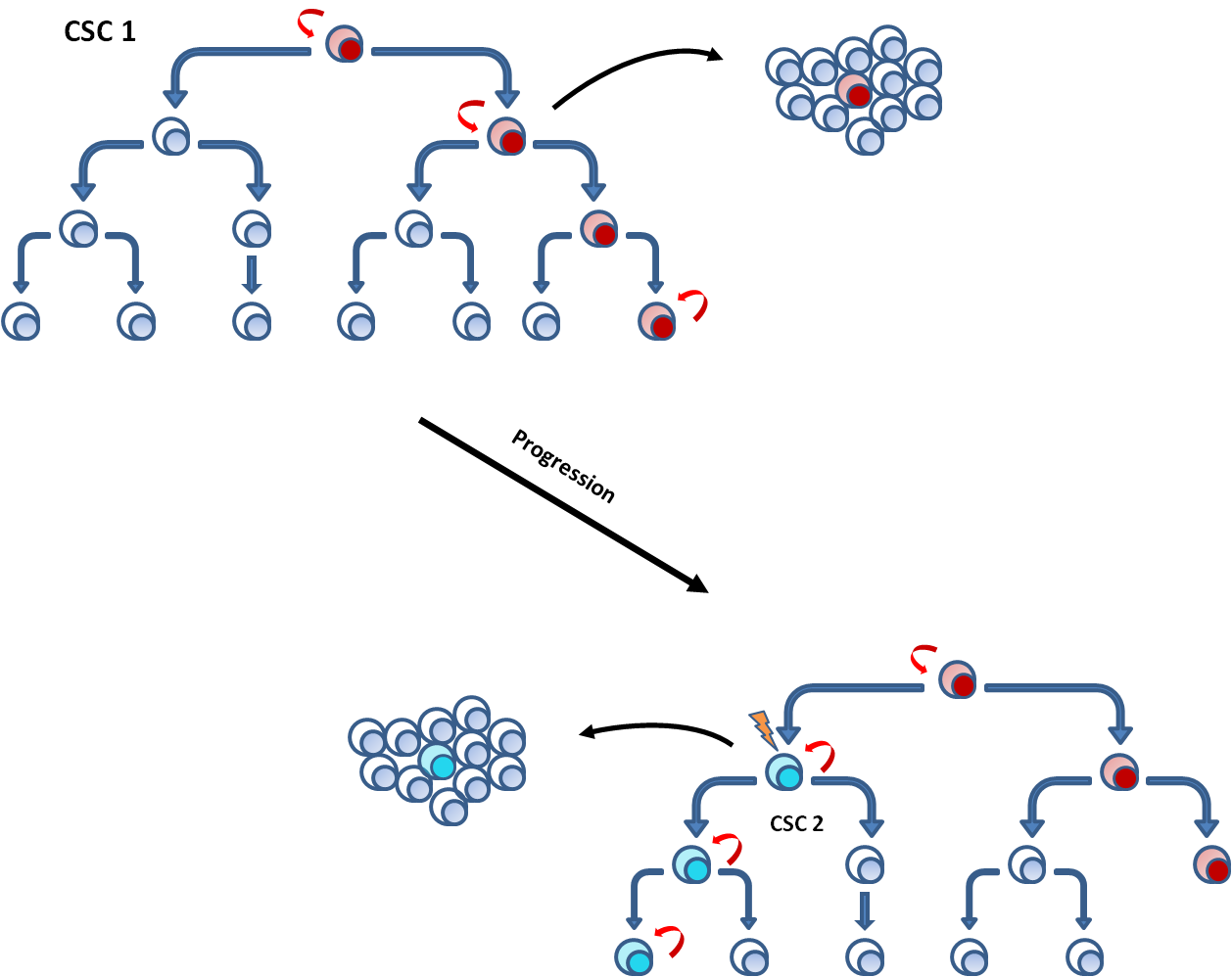
Figure 5: Both tumor models may play a role in the maintenance of a tumor. Initially, tumor growth is assured with a specific CSC (CSC1). With tumor progression, another CSC (CSC 2) may arise due to the clonal selection. The development of a new more aggressive CSC may result from the acquisition of an additional mutation or epigenetic modification.

=== The cancer stem cell immunology model ===
This model suggests that immunological properties may be important for understanding tumorigenesis and heterogeneity. As such, CSCs can be very rare in some tumors, but some researchers found that a large proportion of tumor cells can initiate tumors if transplanted into severely immunocompromised mice, and thus questioned the relevance of rare CSCs. However, both stem cells and CSCs possess unique immunological properties which render them highly resistant towards immunosurveillance. Thus, only CSCs may be able to seed tumors in patients with functional immunosurveillance, and immune privilege may be a key criterion for identifying CSCs. Furthermore, the model suggests that CSCs may initially be dependent on stem cell niches, and CSCs may function there as a reservoir in which mutations can accumulate over decades unrestricted by the immune system. Clinically overt tumors may grow if: A) CSCs lose their dependence on niche factors (less differentiated tumors), B) their offspring of highly proliferative, yet initially immunogenic normal tumor cells evolve means to escape immunosurveillance or C) the immune system may lose its tumorsuppressive capacity, e.g. due to ageing.

== Debate ==
The existence of CSCs is under debate, because many studies found no cells with their specific characteristics. Cancer cells must be capable of continuous proliferation and self-renewal to retain the many mutations required for carcinogenesis and to sustain the growth of a tumor, since differentiated cells (constrained by the Hayflick Limit) cannot divide indefinitely. For therapeutic consideration, if most tumor cells are endowed with stem cell properties, targeting tumor size directly is a valid strategy. If CSCs are a small minority, targeting them may be more effective. Another debate is over the origin of CSCs - whether from dysregulation of normal stem cells or from a more specialized population that acquired the ability to self-renew (which is related to the issue of stem cell plasticity). Confounding this debate is the discovery that many cancer cells demonstrate a phenotypic plasticity under therapeutic challenge, altering their transcriptomes to a more stem-like state to escape destruction. According to one theory, cancer recurrence is caused by the phenotype change of malignant cell populations, when they are exposed to chemotherapy that allows those cells that have a slower pace of proliferation to survive (rather dormant, quiescent cells), while killing those that proliferate faster. The dormant cells may give rise to clones that remain slow-cycling for long periods of time, until they are exposed to conditions (for example inflammation) that trigger the appearance of fast cycling, aggressive tumors. The phenotype plasticity is then at least in part explained by the fact that the "stem-like" cancer cell clones have chromatin that is exposed in a manner that allows those cells to express key genes with different dynamics (kinetics and magnitude) than the rest of the tumor, and also with different dynamics when compared to non-tumor cells.

== Evidence ==
The first conclusive evidence for CSCs came in 1997. Bonnet and Dick isolated a subpopulation of leukemia cells that expressed surface marker CD34, but not CD38. The authors established that the CD34^{+}/CD38^{−} subpopulation is capable of initiating tumors in NOD/SCID mice that were histologically similar to the donor. The first evidence of a solid tumor cancer stem-like cell followed in 2002 with the discovery of a clonogenic, sphere-forming cell isolated and characterized from adult human brain gliomas. Human cortical glial tumors contain neural stem-like cells expressing astroglial and neuronal markers in vitro. Cancer stem cells isolated from adult human gliomas were shown to induce tumours that resembled the parent tumour when grafted into intracranial nude mouse models.

In cancer research experiments, tumor cells are sometimes injected into an experimental animal to establish a tumor. Disease progression is then followed in time and novel drugs can be tested for their efficacy. Tumor formation requires thousands or tens of thousands of cells to be introduced. Classically, this was explained by poor methodology (i.e., the tumor cells lose their viability during transfer) or the critical importance of the microenvironment, the particular biochemical surroundings of the injected cells. Supporters of the CSC paradigm argue that only a small fraction of the injected cells, the CSCs, have the potential to generate a tumor. In human acute myeloid leukemia the frequency of these cells is less than 1 in 10,000.

Further evidence comes from histology. Many tumors are heterogeneous and contain multiple cell types native to the host organ. Tumour heterogeneity is commonly retained by tumor metastases. This suggests that the cell that produced them had the capacity to generate multiple cell types, a classical hallmark of stem cells.

The existence of leukemia stem cells prompted research into other cancers. CSCs have recently been identified in several solid tumors, including:

- Brain
- Breast
- Colon
- Ovary
- Pancreas
- Prostate
- Melanoma
- Multiple Myeloma
- Non-melanoma skin cancer (basal cell carcinoma and squamous cell carcinoma)

=== Mechanistic and mathematical models ===
Once the pathways to cancer are hypothesized, it is possible to develop predictive mathematical models, e.g., based on the cell compartment method. For instance, the growths of abnormal cells can be denoted with specific mutation probabilities. Such a model predicted that repeated insult to mature cells increases the formation of abnormal progeny and the risk of cancer. The clinical efficacy of such models remains unestablished.

== Origin ==
Figure 6: Hierarchical organisation of a tumour according to the CSC model.

The origin of CSCs is an active research area. The answer may depend on the tumor type and phenotype. So far the hypothesis that tumors originate from a single "cell of origin" has not been demonstrated using the cancer stem cell model. This is because cancer stem cells are not present in end-stage tumors.

Origin hypotheses include mutants in developing stem or progenitor cells, mutants in adult stem cells or adult progenitor cells and mutant, differentiated cells that acquire stem-like attributes. These theories often focus on a tumor's "cell of origin".

=== Hypotheses ===
==== Stem cell mutation ====
The "mutation in stem cell niche populations during development" hypothesis claims that these developing stem populations are mutated and then reproduce so that the mutation is shared by many descendants. These daughter cells are much closer to becoming tumors and their numbers increase the chance of a cancerous mutation.

==== Adult stem cells ====
Another theory associates adult stem (ASC) with tumor formation. This is most often associated with tissues with a high rate of cell turnover (such as the skin or gut). In these tissues, ASCs are candidates because of their frequent cell divisions (compared to most ASCs) in conjunction with the long lifespan of ASCs. This combination creates the ideal set of circumstances for mutations to accumulate: mutation accumulation is the primary factor that drives cancer initiation. Evidence shows that the association represents an actual phenomenon, although specific cancers have been linked to a specific cause.

==== De-differentiation ====
De-differentiation of mutated cells may create stem cell-like characteristics, suggesting that any cell might become a cancer stem cell. In other words, fully differentiated cell undergoes mutations or extracellular signals that drive it back to a stem-like state. This concept has been demonstrated most recently in prostate cancer models, whereby cells undergoing androgen deprivation therapy appear to transiently alter their transcriptome to that of a neural crest stem-like cell, with the invasive and multipotent properties of this class of stem-like cells.

=== Hierarchy ===
The concept of tumor hierarchy claims that a tumor is a heterogeneous population of mutant cells, all of which share some mutations, but vary in specific phenotype. A tumor hosts several types of stem cells, one optimal to the specific environment and other less successful lines. These secondary lines may be more successful in other environments, allowing the tumor to adapt, including adaptation to therapeutic intervention. If correct, this concept impacts cancer stem cell-specific treatment regimes. Such a hierarchy would complicate attempts to pinpoint the origin.

== Identification ==
CSCs, now reported in most human tumors, are commonly identified and enriched using strategies for identifying normal stem cells that are similar across studies. These procedures include fluorescence-activated cell sorting (FACS), with antibodies directed at cell-surface markers and functional approaches including side population assay or Aldefluor assay. The CSC-enriched result is then implanted, at various doses, in immune-deficient mice to assess its tumor development capacity. This in vivo assay is called a limiting dilution assay. The tumor cell subsets that can initiate tumor development at low cell numbers are further tested for self-renewal capacity in serial tumor studies.

CSCs can also be identified by efflux of incorporated Hoechst dyes via multidrug resistance (MDR) and ATP-binding cassette (ABC) Transporters.

Another approach is sphere-forming assays. Many normal stem cells such as hematopoietic or stem cells from tissues, under special culture conditions, form three-dimensional spheres that can differentiate. As with normal stem cells, the CSCs isolated from brain or prostate tumors also have the ability to form anchor-independent spheres.

Recent years have seen an advent of genetic approaches to identify cancer stem cells in experimental rodents. In such studies, following the induction of cancer (usually through the application of mutagens), a genetic cassette is activated resulting in the expression of an easily identifiable marker, for instance green fluorescent protein (GFP). This overcomes the limitations of traditional approaches (e.g. the classic Bromodeoxyuridine (BrdU) labeling technique has been used to identify slow-cycling cells in animals) as genetic approaches are cell cycle independent and can be used for in vivo pulse-chase labeling to identify quiescent/slow-cycling cells. This strategy, for instance, was instrumental for identifying the so-called Lgr5+ compartment as a cancer stem cell compartment in liver cancer and showing its potential as a viable therapeutic target.

== Heterogeneity (markers) ==
CSCs heterogeneity is a pool of differentiated and undifferentiated tumour cells that are replenished by cells possessing both tumour and stem cell like properties and having phenotypic and metabolic heterogeneity inside the single tumour mass. There are two theories to explain the phenotypic and metabolic heterogeneity of CSCs; clonal variation and cancer stem cell theory. While former theory dictates the role of genetic, epigenetic and micro environment where tumour cell resides to acquire undifferentiated tumorigenic traits. The latter theory focus more on the malignancy traits acquired by stem cells where these undifferentiated and highly tumorigenic stem cells repopulate the differentiated tumour mass.

CSCs have been identified in various solid tumors. Commonly, markers specific for normal stem cells are used for isolating CSCs from solid and hematological tumors. Markers most frequently used for CSC isolation include: CD133 (also known as PROM1), CD44, ALDH1A1, CD34, CD24 and EpCAM (epithelial cell adhesion molecule, also known as epithelial specific antigen, ESA).

CD133 (prominin 1) is a five-transmembrane domain glycoprotein expressed on CD34^{+} stem and progenitor cells, in endothelial precursors and fetal neural stem cells. It has been detected using its glycosylated epitope known as AC133.

EpCAM (epithelial cell adhesion molecule, ESA, TROP1) is hemophilic Ca^{2+}-independent cell adhesion molecule expressed on the basolateral surface of most epithelial cells.

CD90 (THY1) is a glycosylphosphatidylinositol glycoprotein anchored in the plasma membrane and involved in signal transduction. It may also mediate adhesion between thymocytes and thymic stroma.

CD44 (PGP1) is an adhesion molecule that has pleiotropic roles in cell signaling, migration and homing. It has multiple isoforms, including CD44H, which exhibits high affinity for hyaluronate and CD44V which has metastatic properties.

CD24 (HSA) is a glycosylated glycosylphosphatidylinositol-anchored adhesion molecule, which has co-stimulatory role in B and T cells.

CD200 (OX-2) is a type 1 membrane glycoprotein, which delivers an inhibitory signal to immune cells including T cells, natural killer cells and macrophages.

Leptin receptor (LEPR) is a type I cytokine receptor for the fat associate hormone leptin, which plays an important role in promoting malignant progression.

ALDH is a ubiquitous aldehyde dehydrogenase family of enzymes, which catalyzes the oxidation of aromatic aldehydes to carboxyl acids. For instance, it has a role in conversion of retinol to retinoic acid, which is essential for survival.

The first solid malignancy from which CSCs were isolated and identified was breast cancer and they are the most intensely studied. Breast CSCs have been enriched in CD44^{+}CD24^{−/low}, SP and ALDH^{+} subpopulations. Breast CSCs are apparently phenotypically diverse. CSC marker expression in breast cancer cells is apparently heterogeneous and breast CSC populations vary across tumors. Both CD44^{+}CD24^{−} and CD44^{+}CD24^{+} cell populations are tumor initiating cells; however, CSC are most highly enriched using the marker profile CD44^{+}CD49f^{hi}CD133/2^{hi}.

CSCs have been reported in many brain tumors. Stem-like tumor cells have been identified using cell surface markers including CD133, SSEA-1 (stage-specific embryonic antigen-1), EGFR and CD44. The use of CD133 for identification of brain tumor stem-like cells may be problematic because tumorigenic cells are found in both CD133^{+} and CD133^{−} cells in some gliomas and some CD133^{+} brain tumor cells may not possess tumor-initiating capacity.

CSCs were reported in human colon cancer. For their identification, cell surface markers such as CD133, CD44 and ABCB5, functional analysis including clonal analysis and Aldefluor assay were used. Using CD133 as a positive marker for colon CSCs generated conflicting results. The AC133 epitope, but not the CD133 protein, is specifically expressed in colon CSCs and its expression is lost upon differentiation. In addition, CD44^{+} colon cancer cells and additional sub-fractionation of CD44^{+}EpCAM^{+} cell population with CD166 enhance the success of tumor engraftments.

Multiple CSCs have been reported in prostate, lung and many other organs, including liver, pancreas, kidney or ovary. In prostate cancer, the tumor-initiating cells have been identified in CD44^{+} cell subset as CD44^{+}α2β1^{+}, TRA-1-60^{+}CD151^{+}CD166^{+} or ALDH^{+} cell populations. Putative markers for lung CSCs have been reported, including CD133^{+}, ALDH^{+}, CD44^{+} and oncofetal protein 5T4^{+}.

== Metastasis ==
Metastasis is the major cause of tumor lethality. However, not every tumor cell can metastasize. This potential depends on factors that determine growth, angiogenesis, invasion and other basic processes.

=== Epithelial-mesenchymal transition ===
In epithelial tumors, the epithelial-mesenchymal transition (EMT) is considered to be a crucial event. EMT and the reverse transition from mesenchymal to an epithelial phenotype (MET) are involved in embryonic development, which involves disruption of epithelial cell homeostasis and the acquisition of a migratory mesenchymal phenotype. EMT appears to be controlled by canonical pathways such as WNT and transforming growth factor β.

EMT's important feature is the loss of membrane E-cadherin in adherens junctions, where β-catenin may play a significant role. Translocation of β-catenin from adherens junctions to the nucleus may lead to a loss of E-cadherin and subsequently to EMT. Nuclear β-catenin apparently can directly, transcriptionally activate EMT-associated target genes, such as the E-cadherin gene repressor SLUG (also known as SNAI2). Mechanical properties of the tumor microenvironment, such as hypoxia, can contribute to CSC survival and metastatic potential through stabilization of hypoxia inducible factors through interactions with ROS (reactive oxygen species).

Tumor cells undergoing an EMT may be precursors for metastatic cancer cells, or even metastatic CSCs. In the invasive edge of pancreatic carcinoma, a subset of CD133^{+}CXCR4^{+} (receptor for CXCL12 chemokine also known as a SDF1 ligand) cells was defined. These cells exhibited significantly stronger migratory activity than their counterpart CD133^{+}CXCR4^{−} cells, but both showed similar tumor development capacity. Moreover, inhibition of the CXCR4 receptor reduced metastatic potential without altering tumorigenic capacity.

Epithelial-mesenchymal transition requires iron, which is taken up in cells via CD44. These resulting mesenchymal cells have properties of cancer stem cells.

=== Two-phase expression pattern ===
In breast cancer CD44^{+}CD24^{−/low} cells are detectable in metastatic pleural effusions. By contrast, an increased number of CD24^{+} cells have been identified in distant metastases in breast cancer patients. It is possible that CD44^{+}CD24^{−/low} cells initially metastasize and in the new site change their phenotype and undergo limited differentiation. The two-phase expression pattern hypothesis proposes two forms of cancer stem cells - stationary (SCS) and mobile (MCS). SCS are embedded in tissue and persist in differentiated areas throughout tumor progression. MCS are located at the tumor-host interface. These cells are apparently derived from SCS through the acquisition of transient EMT (Figure 7).

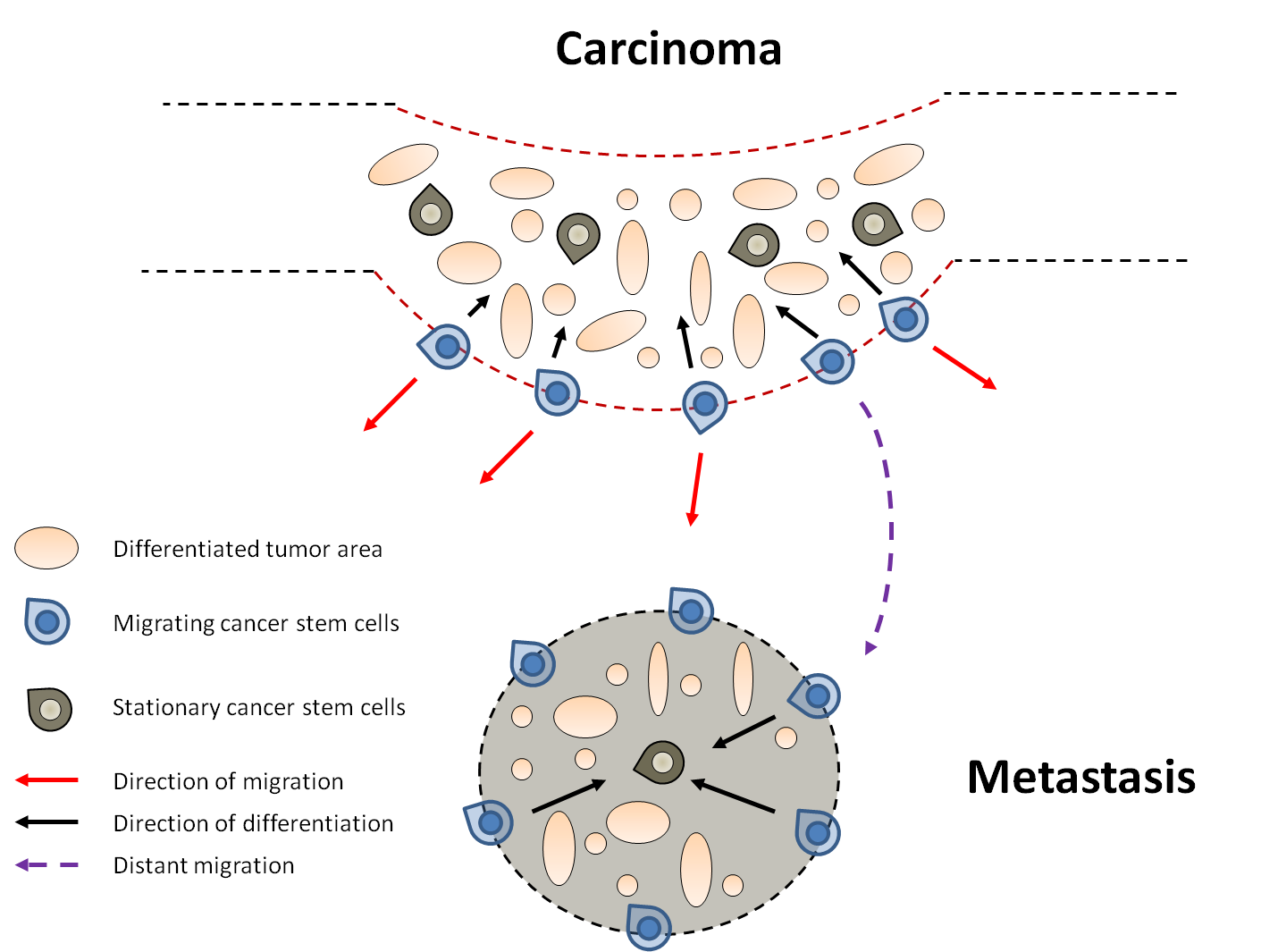
Figure 7: The concept of migrating cancer stem cells (MSC). Stationary cancer stem cells are embedded in early carcinomas and these cells are detectable in the differentiated central area of a tumor. The important step toward malignancy is the induction of epithelial mesenchymal transition (EMT) in the stationary cancer stem cells (SCS), which become mobile or migrating cancer stem cells. Stem cells divide asymmetrically. One daughter cell will begin proliferation and differentiation. The remaining MCS migrates a short distance before undergoing a new asymmetric division, or disseminates through blood vessels or lymphatic vessels and produces a metastasis.

== Implications ==
CSCs have implications for cancer therapy, including for disease identification, selective drug targets, prevention of metastasis and intervention strategies.

=== Treatment ===
CSCs are inherently more resistant to chemotherapeutic agents. There are 5 main factors that contribute to this:

1. Their niche protects them from coming into contact with large concentrations of anti-cancer drugs.
2. They express various transmembrane proteins, such as MDR1 and BCRP, that pump drugs out of the cytoplasm.
3. They divide slowly, like adult stem cells tend to do, and are thus not killed by chemotherapeutic agents that target rapidly replicating cells via damaging DNA or inhibiting mitosis.
4. They upregulate DNA damage repair proteins.
5. They are characterized by an overactivation of anti-apoptotic signaling pathways.

After chemotherapy treatment, surviving CSCs are able to repopulate the tumor and cause a relapse. Additional treatment targeted at removing CSCs in addition to cancerous somatic cells must be used to prevent this.

=== Targeting ===
Selectively targeting CSCs may allow treatment of aggressive, non-resectable tumors, as well as prevent metastasis and relapse. The hypothesis suggests that upon CSC elimination, cancer could regress due to differentiation and/or cell death. The fraction of tumor cells that are CSCs and therefore need to be eliminated is unclear.

Studies looked for specific markers and for proteomic and genomic tumor signatures that distinguish CSCs from others. In 2009, scientists identified the compound salinomycin, which selectively reduces the proportion of breast CSCs in mice by more than 100-fold relative to Paclitaxel, a commonly used chemotherapeutic agent. It was later shown in 2017 that salinomycin kills cancer stem cells by sequestering iron in lysosomes and killing the cells by exploiting their vulnerability to ferroptosis. Some types of cancer cells can survive treatment with salinomycin through autophagy, whereby cells use acidic organelles such as lysosomes to degrade and recycle certain types of proteins. The use of autophagy inhibitors can kill cancer stem cells that survive by autophagy.

The cell surface receptor interleukin-3 receptor-alpha (CD123) is overexpressed on CD34+CD38- leukemic stem cells (LSCs) in acute myelogenous leukemia (AML) but not on normal CD34+CD38- bone marrow cells. Treating AML-engrafted NOD/SCID mice with a CD123-specific monoclonal antibody impaired LSCs homing to the bone marrow and reduced overall AML cell repopulation including the proportion of LSCs in secondary mouse recipients.

A 2015 study packaged nanoparticles with miR-34a and ammonium bicarbonate and delivered them to prostate CSCs in a mouse model. Then they irradiated the area with near-infrared laser light. This caused the nanoparticles to swell three times or more in size bursting the endosomes and dispersing the RNA in the cell. miR-34a can lower the levels of CD44.

In 2017 it was demonstrated that cancer stem cells have more iron and that this is an Achille's heel of these cells. Targeting iron, particularly by sequestering it in lysosomes, can selectively kill this cell population.

A 2018 study identified inhibitors of the ALDH1A family of enzymes and showed that they could selectively deplete putative cancer stem cells in several ovarian cancer cell lines.

A novel small molecule inhibitor, called compound 974 specifically targets cancer stem cells and inhibits cancer stem cell pathways and genes. This inhibitor also reduced the cancer stem cell frequency in mice. This 2022 study also identified a novel relation between ALDH1A1 and senescence. Blocking senescence by compound 974, inhibited cancer stemness in ovarian cancer cells.

It has also been found that CSCs have the ability to exacerbate drug resistance through overexpression of ABC transporter proteins that can pump hydrophobic compounds.

== Pathways ==
The design of new drugs for targeting CSCs requires understanding the cellular mechanisms that regulate cell proliferation. The first advances in this area were made with hematopoietic stem cells (HSCs) and their transformed counterparts in leukemia, the disease for which the origin of CSCs is best understood. Stem cells of many organs share the same cellular pathways as leukemia-derived HSCs.

A normal stem cell may be transformed into a CSC through dysregulation of the proliferation and differentiation pathways controlling it or by inducing oncoprotein activity.

=== BMI-1 ===
The Polycomb group transcriptional repressor Bmi-1 was discovered as a common oncogene activated in lymphoma and later shown to regulate HSCs. The role of Bmi-1 has been illustrated in neural stem cells. The pathway appears to be active in CSCs of pediatric brain tumors.

=== Notch ===
The Notch pathway plays a role in controlling stem cell proliferation for several cell types including hematopoietic, neural and mammary SCs. Components of this pathway have been proposed to act as oncogenes in mammary and other tumors.

A branch of the Notch signaling pathway that involves the transcription factor Hes3 regulates a number of cultured cells with CSC characteristics obtained from glioblastoma patients.

=== Sonic hedgehog and Wnt ===
These developmental pathways are SC regulators. Both Sonic hedgehog (SHH) and Wnt pathways are commonly hyperactivated in tumors and are necessary to sustain tumor growth. However, the Gli transcription factors that are regulated by SHH take their name from gliomas, where they are highly expressed. A degree of crosstalk exists between the two pathways and they are commonly activated together. By contrast, in colon cancer hedgehog signalling appears to antagonise Wnt.

Sonic hedgehog blockers are available, such as cyclopamine. A water-soluble cyclopamine may be more effective in cancer treatment. DMAPT, a water-soluble derivative of parthenolide, induces oxidative stress and inhibits NF-κB signaling for AML (leukemia) and possibly myeloma and prostate cancer. Telomerase is a study subject in CSC physiology. GRN163L (Imetelstat) was recently started in trials to target myeloma stem cells.

Wnt signaling can become independent of regular stimuli, through mutations in downstream oncogenes and tumor suppressor genes that become permanently activated even though the normal receptor has not received a signal. β-catenin binds to transcription factors such as the protein TCF4 and in combination the molecules activate the necessary genes. LF3 strongly inhibits this binding in vitro, in cell lines and reduced tumor growth in mouse models. It prevented replication and reduced their ability to migrate, all without affecting healthy cells. No cancer stem cells remained after treatment. The discovery was the product of "rational drug design", involving AlphaScreens and ELISA technologies.
