= Endogenous regeneration =

Endogenous regeneration in the brain is the ability of cells to engage in the repair and regeneration process. While the brain has a limited capacity for regeneration, endogenous neural stem cells, as well as numerous pro-regenerative molecules, can participate in replacing and repairing damaged or diseased neurons and glial cells. Another benefit that can be achieved by using endogenous regeneration could be avoiding an immune response from the host.

== Neural stem cells in the adult brain ==
During the early development of a human, neural stem cells lie in the germinal layer of the developing brain, ventricular and subventricular zones. In brain development, multipotent stem cells (those that can generate different types of cells) are present in these regions, and all of these cells differentiate into neural cell forms, such as neurons, oligodendrocytes and astrocytes. A long-held belief states that the multipotency of neural stem cells would be lost in the adult human brain. However, it is only in vitro, using neurosphere and adherent monolayer cultures, that stem cells from the adult mammalian brain have shown multipotent capacity, while the in vivo study is not convincing. Therefore, the term "neural progenitor" is used instead of "stem cell" to describe limited regeneration ability in the adult brain stem cell.

Neural stem cells (NSC) reside in the subventricular zone (SVZ) of the adult human brain and the dentate gyrus of the adult mammalian hippocampus. Newly formed neurons from these regions participate in learning, memory, olfaction and mood modulation. It has not been definitively determined whether or not these stem cells are multipotents. NSC from the hippocampus of rodents, which can differentiate into dentate granule cells, have developed into many cell types when studied in culture. However, another in vivo study, using NSCs in the postnatal SVZ, showed that the stem cell is restricted to developing into different neuronal sub-type cells in the olfactory bulb. It is believed that the various spatial location niches regulate the differentiation of the neural stem cell.

== Neurogenesis in the central nervous system ==
Santiago Ramon y Cajal, a neuroscience pioneer, concluded that the generation of neurons occurs only in the prenatal phase of human development, not after birth. This theory had long been the fundamental principle of neuroscience. However, in the mid-20th century, evidence of adult mammalian neurogenesis was found in rodent hippocampus and other region of the brain. In the intact adult mammalian brain, neuroregeneration maintains the function and structure of the central nervous system (CNS). The most adult stem cells in the brain are found in the subventricular zone at the lateral walls of the lateral ventricle. Another region where neurogenesis takes place in the adult brain is the subgranular zone (SGZ) of the dentate gyrus in the hippocampus. While the exact mechanism that maintains functional NSCs in these regions is still unknown, NSCs have shown an ability to restore neurons and glia in response to certain pathological conditions. However, so far, this regeneration by NSCs is insufficient to restore the full function and structure of an injured brain. However, endogenous neuroregeneration, unlike using embryonic stem cell implantation, is anticipated to treat damaged CNS without immunogenesis or tumorigenesis.

== Neurogenesis in subgranular zone ==
Progenitor cells in the dentate gyrus of the hippocampus migrate to the nearby location and differentiate into granule cells. As a part of the limbic system, new neurons of the hippocampus maintain the function of controlling mood, learning and memory. In the dentate gyrus, putative stem cells, called type 1 cells, proliferate into type 2 and type 3 cells, which are transiently amplifying, lineage-determined progenitor cells. Type 1 cells in the hippocampus are multipotent in vitro. However, although there is evidence that both new neurons and glia are generated in the hippocampus in vivo, no exact relationship of neurogenesis to type 1 cells is shown.

In the hippocampus, newly formed neurons contribute only a small portion to the entire neuron population. These new neurons have different electrophysiology compared to the rest of the existing neurons. This may be evidence that generating new neurons in the SGZ is part of learning and memorizing activity of mammals. Several studies have been performed to explain the relationship between neurogenesis and learning. In the case of learning, that related to the hippocampal function, a significantly increased number of neurons are generated in the SGZ and survival of the new neurons is increased if they are required for retention of memory. In addition to learning and memorizing, neurogenesis in the SGZ is also affected by mood and emotion. With constant, inescapable stress, which usually results in emotional depression, there is a significant decrease in neurogenesis, the effect of which can be reversed by treatment with fluoxetine.

== Neurogenesis in subventricular zone ==
The largest NSC population in the brain is found in the SVZ. The SVZ is considered a micro-environment called a "stem cell niche" that retains the NSC's capacity of self-renewing and multipotency. Basic fibroblast growth factor (FGF2), hepatocyte growth factor (HGF), Notch-1, sonic hedgehog (SHH), noggin, ciliary neurotrophic factor (CNTF), and a soluble carbohydrate-binding protein, Galectin-1, are reported as factors that maintain such properties of NSC in stem cell niche. Like stem cells in SGZ, progenitor cells in SVZ also differentiate into neurons and form an intermediate cell called a transiently amplifying cell (TAC). A recent study revealed that beta-catenin signaling, Wnt β-catenin, regulates the differentiation of TAC.

NSCs in the SVZ have a distinct capacity to migrate into the olfactory bulb in the anterior tip of the telencephalon by a pathway called the rostral migratory stream (RMS). This migration is unique to new neurons in the SVZ that embryonic neurogenesis and neurogenesis at other region of the brain are not able to perform. Another unique neurogenesis in the SVZ is neurogenesis by astrocytes. A study done by Doetsch (1999) showed that astrocytes in the SVZ can be dedifferentiate and differentiate into neurons in the olfactory bulb. Among four types of cells in the SVZ (migrating neuroblasts, immature precursors, astrocytes, and ependymal cells), migrating neuroblasts and immature precursors are silenced with the anti-mitotic agent and astrocytes are infected with a retrovirus. In the result, neurons that have the retrovirus are found in the olfactory bulb.

== Factors affecting neurogenesis ==
Neurogenesis in the adult mammalian brain is affected by various factors, including exercise, stroke, brain insult and pharmacological treatments. For example, kainic acid-induced seizures, antidepressant (fluoxetine), neurotransmitters such as GABA and growth factors (fibroblast growth factors (FGFs), epidermal growth factor (EGF), neuregulins (NRGs), vascular endothelial growth factor (VEGF), and pigment epithelium-derived factor (PEDF) induce formation of neuroblasts. The final destination of NSCs is determined by "niche" signals. Wnt signaling drives NSCs to the formation of new neurons in the SGZ, whereas bone morphogenic proteins (BMPs) promote NSC differentiation into glia cells in the SVZ.

However, in the case of brain injury, neurogenesis seems insufficient to repair damaged neurons. Thus, Cajal's theory was accepted for a long time. In actuality, in the intercranial physiological condition, many neurogenesis inhibitors are present (for example, axon growth-inhibitory ligands expressed in oligodendrocytes, myelin, NG2-glia, and reactive astrocytes in the lesion and degenerating tracts, and fibroblasts in scar tissue). The inhibitory ligands bind to growth cone receptors on a damaged neuron, which causes repulsion and collapse of the growth cone in the damaged regions. Among inhibitory factors, oligodendrocyte and myelin-derived inhibitory ligands are membrane-bound, meaning that, in the case of injury, those factors are not upregulated or overexpressed, rather it is from direct contact between intact or degraded myelin (or oligodendrocytes) and newly forming neurons.

Nevertheless, with scar formation, many cell types in the brain release growth-inhibitory ligands such as basal lamina components, inhibitory axon guidance molecules and chondroitin sulfate proteoglycans. Inhibitory action of such factors may be a protection of the brain from inflammation. Okano and Sawamoto used an astrocyte-selective conditional Stat3-deficient mice model to examine the role of reactive astrocytes. The result was increased widespread CD11b-positive inflammatory cell invasion and demyelination.

== Application ==
Brain damage itself can induce endogenous regeneration. Many studies have proven endogenous regeneration as a possible treatment of brain damage. However, the inhibitory reaction of the surrounding tissue of damaged region must be overcome before the treatment produces significant improvement.

=== Traumatic brain injury ===
In the study of the endogenous regeneration of the brain done by Scharff and co-researchers, damaged neurons in a songbird brain are regenerated with the same neuronal types where regeneration occurs (in the case of the study, the hippocampus). However, in places where normal regeneration of the neuron does not occur, there was no replacement of damaged neurons. Thus, recovering brain function after a brain injury was supposed to have limitations. However, a current study revealed that neurons are repaired to some degree after damage, from the SVZ.

The migrating ability of progenitor cells in the SVZ form chain-like structures and laterally move progenitor cells towards the injured region. Along with progenitor cells, thin astrocytic processes and blood vessels also play an important role in the migration of neuroblasts, suggesting that the blood vessels may act as a scaffold. Other factors that contribute of the migration are slit proteins (produced at the choroid plexus) and their gradient (generated by the flow of cerebrospinal fluid). However, only 0.2% of new neurons survived and functioned in this study. Enhancing neurogenesis can be done by injecting growth factors such as fibroblast growth factor-2 (FGF-2) and epidermal growth factor (EGF). However, enhanced neurogenesis also have the possibility of epilepsy resulting in prolonged seizures.

=== Parkinson's Disease ===
Although endogenous regeneration methods are showing some promising evidence in treating brain ischemia, the current body of knowledge regarding promoting and inhibiting endogenous regeneration is not sufficient to treat Parkinson's disease. Both extrinsic and intrinsic modulation of pathological and physiological stimulation prevent the progenitor cell from differentiating into dopamine cells. Further research must be done to understand factors that affect progenitor cell differentiation in order to treat Parkinson's disease.

Despite the difficulties in replacing compromised dopamine neurons through endogenous sources, recent work suggests that pharmacological activation of endogenous neural stem cells or neural precursor cells results in powerful neuronal rescue and motor skill improvements through a signal transduction pathway that involves the phosphorylation of STAT3 on the serine residue and subsequent Hes3 expression increase (STAT3-Ser/Hes3 Signaling Axis).
