= Axel Behrens =

German-British molecular biologist

- Education: University of Vienna (diploma degree); University of Zurich (PhD)
- Known for: Cancer stem cell biology
- Scientific career
- Workplaces: Institute of Cancer Research; Imperial College London
- Website: www.convergencesciencecentre.ac.uk

Axel Behrens is a German-British molecular biologist and an expert in cancer stem cell biology. He is the Scientific Director of the Cancer Research UK Convergence Science Centre in London, a senior group leader at the Institute of Cancer Research and a professor at Imperial College London.

== Education and early life ==
Behrens was educated at schools in Germany and Austria. He studied Molecular Genetics in Austria at the University of Innsbruck and University of Vienna. He followed this up with postgraduate research at The Institute of Molecular Pathology, University of Vienna and was awarded a PhD in 1998 for research on c-Jun/JNK signalling in cancer, supervised by Professor Erwin Wagner.

== Career and research ==
After his PhD, Behrens pursued postdoctoral research in Switzerland at the University of Zurich with Adriano Aguzzi. In 2001 he joined the Cancer Research UK London Research Institute (which became part of the Francis Crick Institute in 2015.) to head up the Adult Stem Cell Laboratory. In 2020, Prof Behrens became the inaugural Scientific Director of the Cancer Research UK Convergence Science Centre, a collaborative partnership between Cancer Research UK, The Institute of Cancer Research (ICR) and Imperial College London with the aim to develop innovative multi-disciplinary solutions for key problems in cancer research and cancer treatment. In 2020 he was also appointed as Head of the Adult Stem Cell laboratory at the ICR in London and Professor of cancer biology at Imperial.

Behrens is a well-known international expert in cancer stem cell biology with significant contributions in the field. From research it has become clear that tumours are organised in a cellular hierarchy, with the so-called cancer stem cells (CSC), also called tumour initiating cells (TICs), being at the apex. It is believed that CSCs mediate tumour growth, precipitate tumour relapse after treatment, and are responsible for metastasis formation. Among Behrens' laboratory discoveries is the characterisation of CSC populations in breast cancer and pancreatic ductal adenocarcinoma (PDAC), and based on this work novel cancer therapeutics targeting CSCs are currently being developed. Additionally, the Behrens laboratory invented a 3D imaging technology termed Fast Light microscopic Analysis of antibody Stained wHole organs (FLASH) that provides unprecedented capabilities to visualise large tissues at single cell resolution. The Behrens lab used FLASH to for the first time provide a 3-dimensional description of the origin of pancreatic cancer

== Awards and honours ==
- 2004 EMBO Young Investigator.
- 2012 EMBO Member.
- 2015 Member of Academia Europaea.
- 2024 Fellow of the Academy of Medical Sciences (FMedSci)
