= Sean J. Morrison =

Canadian-American cancer researcher

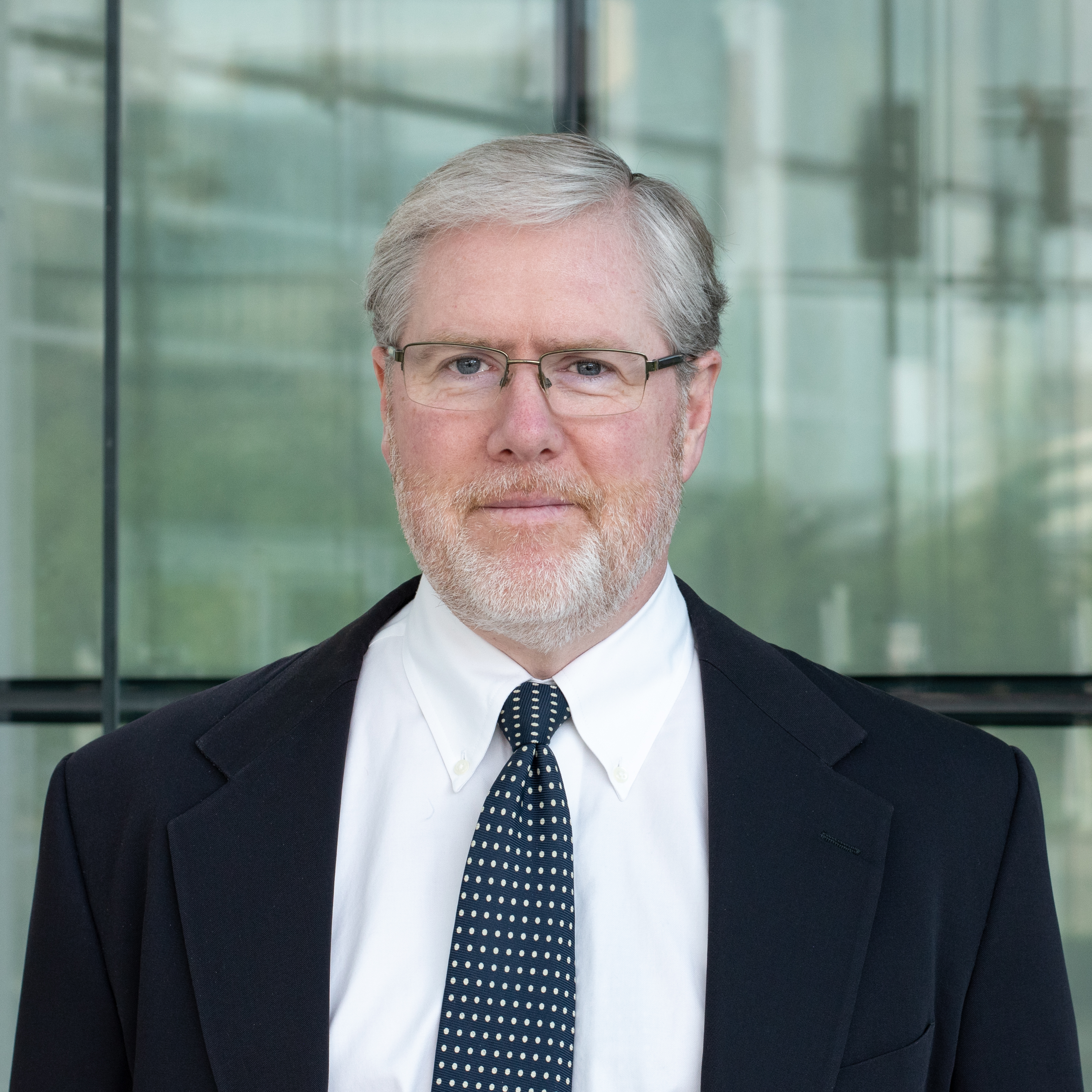
- Education: Dalhousie University; Stanford University; California Institute of Technology
- Known for: Stem Cell Research
- Awards: Howard Hughes Medical Institute Investigator, National Academy of Medicine, National Academy of Sciences, European Molecular Biology Organization
- Scientific career
- Fields: Stem Cells, Cancer Biology
- Workplaces: Children's Research Institute; UT Southwestern; University of Michigan
- Website: https://cri.utsw.edu/

Sean J. Morrison is a Canadian-American stem cell biologist and cancer researcher. Morrison is the director of Children's Medical Center Research Institute at UT Southwestern (CRI), a nonprofit research institute established in 2011 as a joint venture between Children's Health System of Texas and UT Southwestern Medical Center. With Morrison as founding director, CRI was established to perform transformative biomedical research at the interface of stem cell biology, cancer and metabolism to better understand the biological basis of disease. He is a Howard Hughes Medical Institute Investigator, has served as president of the International Society for Stem Cell Research, and is a member of the U.S. National Academy of Medicine, U.S. National Academy of Sciences and European Molecular Biology Organization.

Morrison's laboratory studies the mechanisms that regulate stem cell function in adult tissues and the ways in which cancer cells hijack those mechanisms to enable tumor formation.

== Education and awards ==
Morrison attended Dalhousie University and graduated with a B.Sc. in biology and chemistry in 1991. He earned a Ph.D. in immunology in 1996 for working on the isolation and characterization of blood-forming (hematopoietic) stem cells in the laboratory of Dr. Irving L. Weissman at Stanford University. Morrison then worked as a postdoctoral fellow on the isolation and characterization of neural crest stem cells in Dr. David Anderson's laboratory at the California Institute of Technology from 1996 to 1999. From 1999 to 2011, he was a professor at the University of Michigan, where he founded their Center for Stem Cell Biology. Since 2011, Morrison has held the Mary McDermott Cook Chair in Pediatric Genetics, Kathryne and Gene Bishop Distinguished Chair in Pediatric Research, and been a professor in the Department of Pediatrics at University of Texas Southwestern Medical Center. Morrison has also been a Howard Hughes Medical Institute Investigator from 2000 to present.

Morrison was a Searle Scholar (2000-2003), and received the Presidential Early Career Award for Scientists and Engineers (2003), the International Society for Hematology and Stem Cells McCulloch and Till Award (2007), the American Association of Anatomists Harland Mossman Award (2008), and a MERIT Award from the National Institute on Aging (2009). From 2015 to 2016 Morrison served as president of the International Society for Stem Cell Research. He was elected to the U.S. National Academy of Medicine in 2018, U.S. National Academy of Sciences in 2020, and European Molecular Biology Organization in 2023.

== Research ==
The regulation of stem cell self-renewal

Morrison developed methods to distinguish self-renewing stem cells from multipotent progenitors in the blood-forming system and in the peripheral and central nervous systems. This work showed that self-renewal potential is determined cell-intrinsically in stem cells and made it possible to identify gene products that regulate stem cell maintenance across multiple tissues. The Morrison laboratory identified a series of key stem cell self-renewal regulators, revealing several important principles. First, stem cell self-renewal is mechanistically distinct from restricted progenitor proliferation. Second, many self-renewal mechanisms are conserved among stem cells in different tissues. Third, these mechanisms comprise networks of proto-oncogenes and tumor suppressors that are dysregulated in cancer; cancer cells tend to hijack stem cell self-renewal mechanisms to enable tumorigenesis. Fourth, the Morrison laboratory showed that these networks change over time, conferring temporal changes in stem cell properties that match the changing growth and regeneration demands of tissues (for example during fetal development and adulthood). Fifth, tumor suppressor expression increases with age in stem cells, suppressing the development of cancer but also reducing stem cell function and tissue regenerative capacity during aging.

Identification of the hematopoietic stem cell niche

The Morrison laboratory also identified cell-extrinsic mechanisms by which the niche (a specialized microenvironment that maintains stem cells in tissues) regulates the maintenance of blood-forming stem cells in adult blood-forming tissues. They were the first to propose that hematopoietic stem cells (HSCs) reside in perivascular niches after discovering SLAM family markers that enabled the localization of HSCs in hematopoietic tissues. They showed in that study that most HSCs reside adjacent to sinusoidal blood vessels in the bone marrow and spleen. They showed that endothelial cells and Leptin Receptor+ perivascular stromal cells are the major sources of factors required for HSC maintenance in the bone marrow. The Leptin Receptor+ cells include skeletal stem cells that are a major source of new bone cells and adipocytes that form in adult bone marrow. The identification of these niche cells made it possible to test whether hematopoiesis or osteogenesis are regulated by yet undiscovered growth factors in the bone marrow. As a result of this work, the Morrison lab discovered Osteolectin/Clec11a, a bone-forming growth factor made by Leptin Receptor+ cells that is required to maintain the adult skeleton by promoting osteogenesis.

Cancer cell self-replication and metastasis

The Morrison laboratory also compared the self-renewal of stem cells to the self-replication of cancer cells. They developed a xenograft assay in which single melanoma cells from patients could form tumors. This showed that cells with tumor-forming potential are abundant and phenotypically diverse in melanoma, demonstrating that the cancer stem cell model does not apply to some cancers. Melanomas also spontaneously metastasize in this xenograft model, creating an assay in which the metastasis of human melanomas could be studied in vivo. They used this xenograft model to characterize the mechanisms that regulate distant metastasis, discovering that cancer cells experience a dramatic increase in oxidative stress during metastasis, leading to the death of most metastasizing cells. The rare melanoma cells that survive during metastasis undergo reversible metabolic changes that confer oxidative stress resistance. In fact, intrinsic metabolic differences among melanomas confer differences in metastatic potential. They found that oxidative stress kills melanoma cells by inducing ferroptosis, a form of cell death marked by lipid oxidation. Melanoma cells appear to metastasize first through lymphatics because lymphatics protect melanoma cells from oxidative stress and render them ferroptosis-resistant, increasing their ability to survive subsequent distant metastasis through the blood. These results raise the possibility that "pro-oxidant" therapies that exacerbate oxidative stress in cancer cells could be used to inhibit cancer progression.

== Advocacy ==
Morrison has been active in shaping public policy related to stem cell research. He testified before the U.S. Congress, served as a leader in the successful "Proposal 2" campaign to protect and regulate stem cell research in Michigan's state constitution, and has chaired the public policy committee for the International Society for Stem Cell Research since 2015.
