= Tannishtha Reya =

Indian-born American cell and developmental biologist

- Born: India
- Education: Williams College; University of Pennsylvania

Tannishtha Reya is an Indian-born American cell and developmental biologist working in cancer research at Columbia University in New York. She has received numerous awards, including an NIH Director's Pioneer Award in 2009 and an NCI Outstanding Investigator Award in 2015. Reya is particularly known for co-authoring an influential publication in 2001 coining the term "cancer stem cell" to describe a cancer cell that mirrors the properties of stem cells of healthy organs in the context of leukaemias or solid tumours.

== Education ==
Reya was born in India and is the granddaughter of writers Buddhadeb Bose and Protiva Bose. She moved to the US when she was seventeen to take a liberal arts degree at Williams College in Massachusetts because she wanted to be "exposed to both literature and the sciences.". She then pursued her PhD in immunology at the University of Pennsylvania under the guidance of Simon Carding. Reya conducted her postdoctoral research first in the laboratory of Rudolf Grosschedl at the University of California San Francisco and then with Irving Weissman at Stanford University.

== Career ==
Reya is professor of Physiology and Cellular Biophysics at Columbia University. Previously she was faculty at Duke University and the University of California, San Diego. Her research on acute myeloid leukaemia explored the possibilities of targeting a cell surface molecule (CD98) to inhibit the growth of cancer cells. Her most recent research is in the field of pancreatic cancer. She and her team are investigating the roles of immune system receptors and potential related therapies.

Reya currently serves on the editorial board of the journal Science and has been the recipient of numerous grants, including Stand Up to Cancer grants in 2017 and 2019. In 2019, Reya was interviewed by the Stem Cell Podcast.
