= Enteric glia =

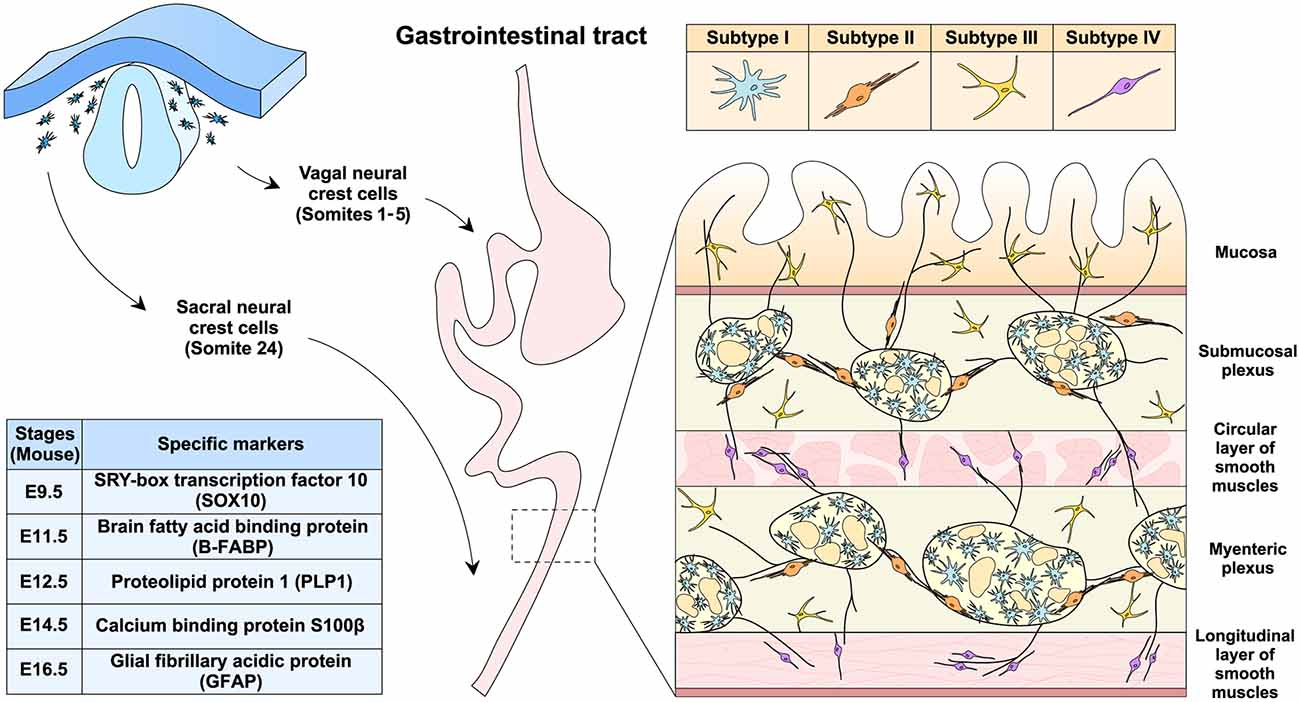

The enteric glia, enteric glial cells or EGCs are a population of neuroglial cells that populate the enteric nervous system.

These cells are one of the major neural-crest-derived cell lineages, found throughout the gastrointestinal tract. The enteric glial cells play a variety of roles, such as modulating nociception (pain sensation), exerting immune functions, and coordinating gastrointestinal motility. They are the largest glial population outside the brain, and considered "a key node of the gut-brain axis".
