= Fractional kill =

In oncology, the fact that one round of chemotherapy does not kill all the cells in a tumor is a poorly understood phenomenon called fractional kill, or fractional cell kill.

The fractional kill hypothesis states that a defined chemotherapy concentration, applied for a defined time period, will kill a constant fraction of the cells in a population, independent of the absolute number of cells. In solid tumors, poor access of the tumor to the drug can limit the fraction of tumor cells killed, but the validity of the fractional kill hypothesis has also been established in animal models of leukemia, as well as in human leukemia and lymphoma, where drug access is less of an issue.

Because only a fraction of the cells die with each treatment, repeated doses must be administered to continue to reduce the size of the tumor. Current chemotherapy regimens apply drug treatment in cycles, with the frequency and duration of treatments limited by toxicity to the patient. The goal is to reduce the tumor population to zero with successive fractional kills. For example, assuming a 99% kill per cycle of chemotherapy, a tumor of 10^{11} cells would be reduced to less than one cell with six treatment cycles: 10^{11} * 0.01^{6} < 1. However, the tumor can also re-grow during the intervals between treatments, limiting the net reduction of each fractional kill.

== Cited cause of fractional killing: cell cycle effects ==
The fractional killing of tumors in response to treatment is assumed to be due to the cell cycle specificity of chemotherapy drugs. Cytarabine, a DNA-synthesis inhibitor also known as ara-C, is cited as the classic cell cycle phase-specific agent. Chemotherapy dosing schedules have been optimized based on the fact that cytarabine is only expected to be effective in the DNA synthesis (S) phase of the cell cycle. Consistent with this, leukemia patients respond better to cytarabine treatments given every 12 hours rather than every 24 hours. This finding that can be explained by the fact that S-phase in these leukemia cells lasts 18–20 hours, allowing some cells to escape the cytotoxic effect of the drug if it is given every 24 hours. However, alternative explanations are possible, as described below.

== Lack of cell cycle effect in drugs documented to be cell cycle phase specific ==
Very little direct information is available on whether cells undergo apoptosis from a certain point in the cell cycle. One study which did address this topic used flow cytometry or elutriation of synchronized cells treated with actinomycin D1, camptothecin, or aphidicolin, each of which had been documented to exert its effects in a particular phase of the cell cycle. Surprisingly, the authors found that each of the agents was able to induce apoptosis in all phases of the cell cycle, suggesting that the mechanism through which the drugs induce apoptosis may be independent of the drugs’ biochemical targets. In fact, a trace through the literature on the S-phase specificity of cytarabine leads to studies that simply assume S-phase specificity based on cytarabine's reported site of biochemical action, which the later papers reference. The lack of a cell cycle effect for camptothecin has also been reported recently in a live-cell microscopy study.

== Cell-to-cell variation in protein levels ==
A recent paper by Spencer et al. raises the possibility that cell-to-cell variability in protein concentrations may contribute to fractional killing in the case of treatment with TRAIL (TNF-related apoptosis inducing ligand). TRAIL is a ligand native to the human body that is currently being developed as a cancer treatment. Spencer et al. observed fractional killing at a single cell level in several cell lines, even in genetically identical populations grown in homogeneous environments. This paper ruled out the conventional explanation (cell cycle effects) in two of these cell lines, and provided evidence supporting the hypothesis that random variation in cellular initial conditions causes some cells to die while allowing others to survive.
