= PEDF =

Protein-coding gene in the species Homo sapiens

SERPINF1
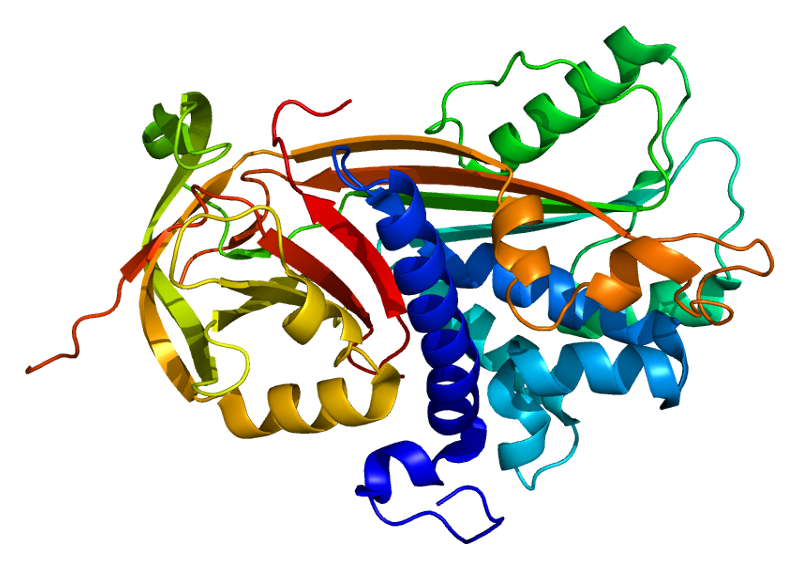

Identifiers
- Aliases: SERPINF1, EPC-1, OI12, OI6, PEDF, PIG35, serpin family F member 1
- External IDs: OMIM: 172860; MGI: 108080; GeneCards: SERPINF1
Available structures
PDB	Ortholog search: PDBe RCSB
PDB	List of PDB id codes 1IMV

Gene location (Human)
Chr.	Chromosome 17 (human)
Band	17p13.3	Start	1,762,029 bp
Band	17p13.3	End	1,777,565 bp

Gene location (Mouse)
Chr.	Chromosome 11 (mouse)
Band	11|11 B5	Start	75,300,595 bp
Band	11|11 B5	End	75,313,527 bp
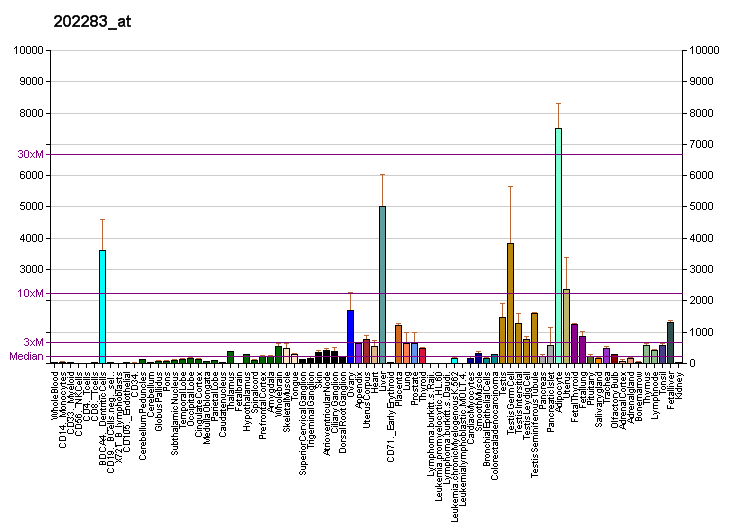
RNA expression pattern
Bgee	Human / Mouse (ortholog); Top expressed in: retinal pigment epithelium; pericardium; canal of the cervix; left uterine tube; gallbladder; periodontal fiber; vena cava; right ovary; right lobe of liver; gastric mucosa / Top expressed in: calvaria; molar; body of femur; ankle; left lobe of liver; aortic valve; ascending aorta; stroma of bone marrow; lip; cervix; More reference expression data
BioGPS	More reference expression data
Gene ontology
Molecular function	protein binding; serine-type endopeptidase inhibitor activity
Cellular component	extracellular matrix; melanosome; extracellular region; basement membrane; axon; soma; perinuclear region of cytoplasm; axon hillock; extracellular exosome; extracellular space; collagen-containing extracellular matrix
Biological process	cellular response to retinoic acid; kidney development; ageing; response to arsenic-containing substance; negative regulation of gene expression; cellular response to dexamethasone stimulus; negative regulation of endothelial cell migration; multicellular organism development; cellular response to cobalt ion; retina development in camera-type eye; short-term memory; negative regulation of epithelial cell proliferation involved in prostate gland development; positive regulation of neuron projection development; ovarian cycle; negative regulation of angiogenesis; cell population proliferation; negative regulation of inflammatory response; cellular response to glucose stimulus; response to acidic pH; negative regulation of neuron death; negative regulation of endopeptidase activity; positive regulation of neurogenesis
Sources:Amigo / QuickGO
Orthologs
Databases	NCBI: entry; OMA: entry
Species	Human	Mouse
Entrez	5176	20317
Ensembl	ENSG00000132386; ENSG00000282307	ENSMUSG00000000753
UniProt	P36955	P97298
RefSeq (mRNA)	NM_002615; NM_001329903; NM_001329904; NM_001329905	NM_011340
RefSeq (protein)	NP_001316832; NP_001316833; NP_001316834; NP_002606	NP_035470
Location (UCSC)	Chr 17: 1.76 – 1.78 Mb	Chr 11: 75.3 – 75.31 Mb
PubMed search
- Wikidata
View/Edit Human	View/Edit Mouse

Pigment epithelium-derived factor (PEDF) also known as serpin F1 (SERPINF1), is a multifunctional secreted protein that has anti-angiogenic, anti-tumorigenic, and neurotrophic functions. Found in vertebrates, this 50 kDa protein is being researched as a therapeutic candidate for treatment of such conditions as choroidal neovascularization, heart disease, and cancer. In humans, pigment epithelium-derived factor is encoded by the SERPINF1 gene.

== Discovery ==
Pigment epithelium-derived factor (PEDF) was originally discovered by Joyce Tombran-Tink and Lincoln Johnson in the late 1980s. This group was studying human retinal cell development by identifying secreted factors produced by the retinal pigmented epithelium (RPE), a layer of cells that supports the retina. Upon noticing RPE produced a factor that promoted the differentiation of primitive retinal cells into cells of a neuronal phenotype, they set out to determine the identity of the factor. They isolated proteins unique to RPE cells and tested the individual proteins for neurotrophic function, meaning promoting a neuronal phenotype. A neurotrophic protein around 50 kilodaltons (kDa) was identified and temporarily named RPE-54 before being officially termed pigment epithelium-derived factor.

Soon thereafter, the same laboratory sequenced the PEDF protein and compared it to a human fetal eye library. They found that PEDF was a previously uncharacterized protein and a member of the serpin (serine protease inhibitor) family.

== Gene ==
The gene encoding human PEDF was localized to the 17th chromosome at position 17p13.1. The human PEDF gene is around 15.6kb, and the mRNA transcript is around 1.5kb. Immediately upstream of the PEDF gene lies a 200bp promoter region with putative binding sites for the transcription factors HNF4, CHOP, and USF. The PEDF gene consists of 8 exons and 7 introns.

The PEDF gene is present in vertebrates from human to fish, but not present in sea squirts, worms, or fruit flies. Sea squirts express several serpin genes, suggesting that the PEDF gene may have arisen from another serpin family member after the evolution of vertebral animals. The gene most homologous to PEDF is its adjacent neighbor on chromosome 17, SerpinF2.

== Protein ==
The PEDF protein is a secreted protein of roughly 50kDa size and 418 amino acids in length. The N-terminus contains a leader sequence responsible for protein secretion out of the cell at residues 1-19. A 34-mer fragment of PEDF (residues 24-57) was shown to have antiangiogenic properties, and a 44-mer (residues 58-101) was shown to have neurotrophic properties. A BLAST search reveals a putative receptor binding site exists between residues 75-124. A nuclear localization sequence (NLS) exists about 150 amino acids into the protein. The additional molecular weight is partly due to a single glycosylation site at residue 285. Near the C-terminus at residues 365-390 lies the reactive center loop (RCL) which is normally involved in serine protease inhibitor activity; however, in PEDF this region does not retain the inhibitory function.

In 2001, the crystal structure of PEDF was successfully generated. The PEDF structure includes 3 beta sheets and 10 alpha helices. This discovery demonstrated that PEDF has an asymmetrical charge distribution across the whole protein. One side of the protein is heavily basic and the other side is heavily acidic, leading to a polar 3-D structure. They proposed that the basic side of the protein contains a heparin binding site.

== Signaling ==
PEDF expression is upregulated by plasminogen kringle domains 1-4 (also known as angiostatin) and the kringle 5 (K5) domain. Hypoxia, or low oxygen conditions, leads to the downregulation of PEDF. This effect is due to hypoxic conditions causing matrix metalloproteinases (MMPs) to proteolytically degrade PEDF. In addition, amyloid beta has been shown to decrease PEDF mRNA levels.

Secreted PEDF binds a receptor on the cell surface termed PEDF-R. PEDF-R has phospholipase A2 activity which liberates fatty acids from glycerolipids. PEDF enhances gamma-secretase activity, leading to the cleavage of the VEGF receptor 1 (VEGFR-1) transmembrane domain. This action interferes with VEGF signaling thereby inhibiting angiogenesis. Laminin receptor is also a target for PEDF, and the interaction occurs between residues 24-57 of PEDF, a region known to regulate antiangiogenic function.

PEDF induces PPAR-gamma expression which in turn induces p53, a tumor suppressor gene involved in cell cycle regulation and apoptosis. Thrombospondin, an antiangiogenic protein, is upregulated by PEDF. PEDF stimulates several other well known signaling cascades such as the Ras pathway, the NF-κB pathway, and extrinsic apoptosis cascades.

== Function ==
PEDF has a variety of functions including antiangiogenic, antitumorigenic, and neurotrophic properties. Endothelial cell migration is inhibited by PEDF. PEDF suppresses retinal neovascularization and endothelial cell proliferation. The antiangiogenic residues 24-57 were shown to be sufficient at inhibiting angiogenesis. PEDF is also responsible for apoptosis of endothelial cells either through the p38 MAPK pathway or through the FAS/FASL pathway Antiangiogenic function is also conferred by PEDF through inhibition of both VEGFR-1 and VEGFR-2.

The antitumorigenic effects of PEDF are not only due to inhibition of supporting vasculature, but also due to effects on the cancer cells themselves. PEDF was shown to inhibit cancer cell proliferation and increase apoptosis via the FAS/FASL pathway. VEGF expression by cancer cells is inhibited by PEDF.

PEDF also displays neurotrophic functions. Retinoblastoma cells differentiate into neurons due to the presence of PEDF. Expression of PEDF in the human retina is found at 7.4 weeks of gestation, suggesting it may play a role in retinal neuron differentiation.

== Clinical significance ==
PEDF, a protein with many functions, has been suggested to play a clinical role in dry eye, choroidal neovascularization, cardiovascular disease, diabetes, diabetic macular edema, osteogenesis imperfecta and cancer. As an antiangiogenic protein, PEDF may help suppress unwanted neovascularization of the eye. Molecules that shift the balance towards PEDF and away from VEGF may prove useful tools in both choroidal neovascularization and preventing cancer metastasis formation.

=== Glaucoma and zinc-mediated modulation ===
Recent work suggests that extracellular zinc ions directly binds PEDF at multiple high-affinity sites, inducing reversible oligomerization and decreasing its negative surface charge. This conformational change is reported to mask functional epitopes required for PEDF’s neurotrophic and anti-angiogenic activities and for collagen binding. In samples from patients with primary open-angle glaucoma, zinc levels in the aqueous humor were approximately twofold higher than in controls. In retinal cell models, zinc stress increased PEDF secretion but impaired its ability to activate its receptor PEDF-R/PNPLA2, attenuating axogenic, differentiative and pro-survival effects. Together, these findings support a mechanism in which excess extracellular zinc inhibits PEDF signaling during glaucomatous neurodegeneration and identify the PEDF–zinc complex as a potential neuroprotective target.
