= Glia =

Support-cells in the nervous system

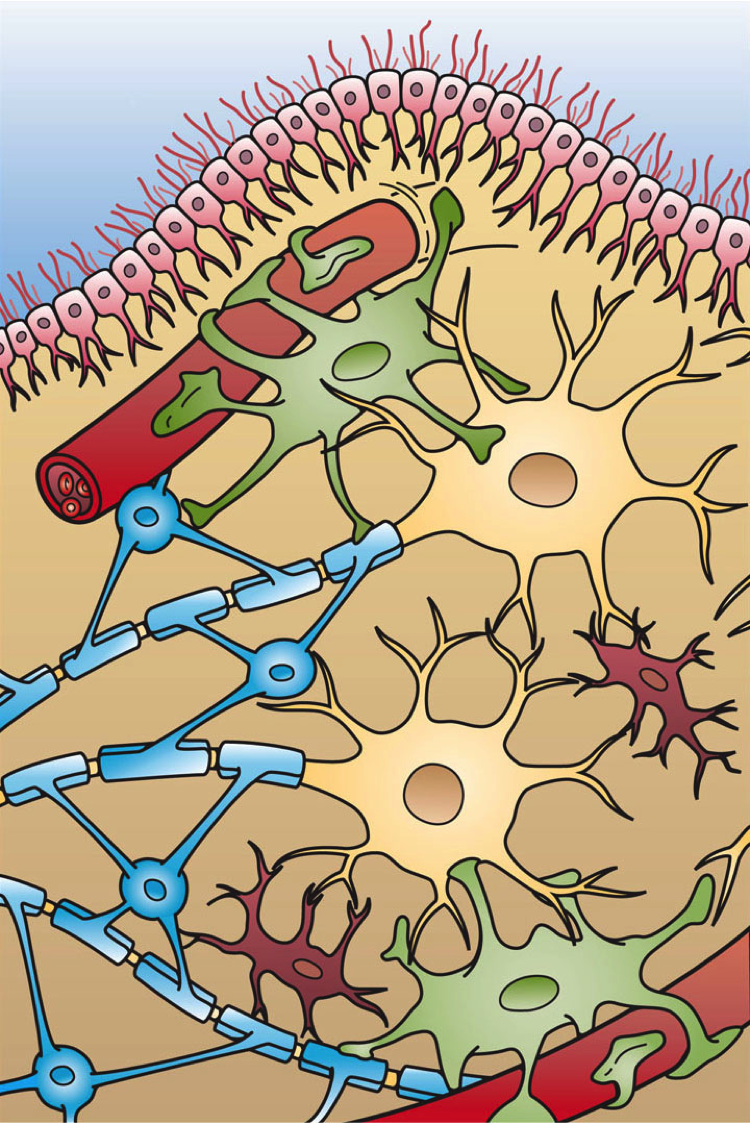
- Illustration of the four different types of glial cells found in the central nervous system: ependymal cells (light pink), astrocytes (green), microglial cells (dark red) and oligodendrocytes (light blue)

Details
- Precursor: Neuroectoderm for macroglia, and hematopoietic stem cells for microglia
- System: Nervous system

Identifiers
- MeSH: D009457
- TA98: A14.0.00.005
- TH: H2.00.06.2.00001
- FMA: 54536 54541, 54536

Glia, also called glial cells or neuroglia, are non-neuronal cells in the central nervous system (the brain and the spinal cord) and in the peripheral nervous system that do not produce electrical impulses. The neuroglia make up more than one half the volume of neural tissue in the human body. They contribute to the maintenance of homeostasis, help form myelin, and provide support and protection for neurons. In the central nervous system, glial cells include oligodendrocytes (that produce myelin), astrocytes, ependymal cells and microglia, and in the peripheral nervous system they include Schwann cells (that produce myelin), and satellite cells.

== Function ==
Glia have four main functions:

- to structurally support neurons, holding them in place
- to supply nutrients and oxygen to neurons
- to insulate one neuron from another
- to destroy pathogens and remove dead neurons

They also play a role in neurotransmission and synaptic connections, and in physiological processes such as breathing. While glia were thought to outnumber neurons by a ratio of 10:1, studies using newer methods and reappraisal of historical quantitative evidence suggests an overall ratio of less than 1:1, with substantial variation between different brain tissues.

Glial cells have far more cellular diversity and functions than neurons, and can respond to and manipulate neurotransmission in multiple ways. Additionally, they can affect both the preservation and consolidation of memories.

Glia were discovered in 1856, by the pathologist Rudolf Virchow in his search for a "connective tissue" in the brain. The term derives from Greek γλία and γλοία "glue" (English: /ˈɡliːə/ or /ˈɡlaɪə/), and suggests the original impression that they were the glue of the nervous system.

== Types ==
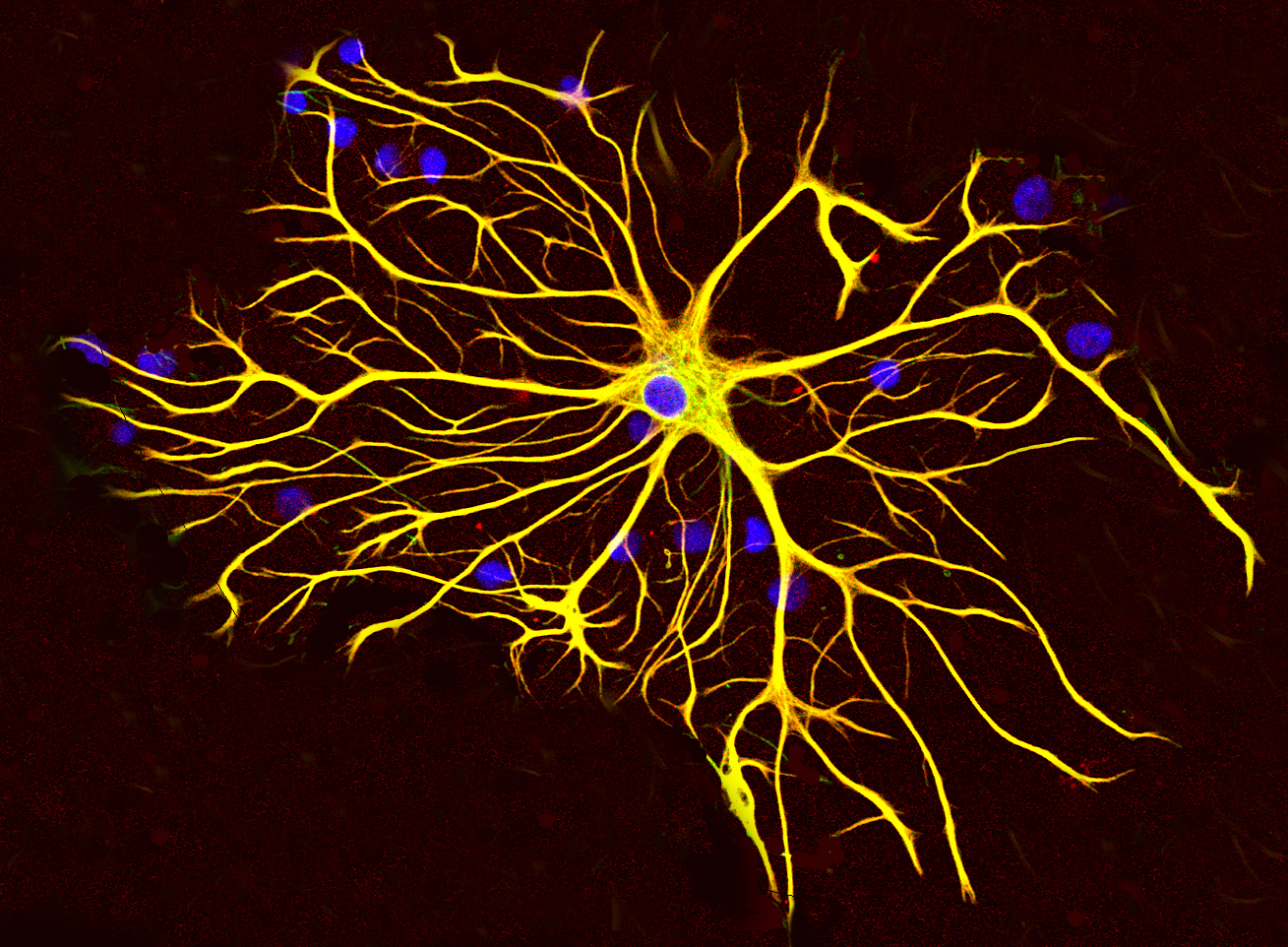
An astrocyte from a rat brain grown in tissue culture and stained with antibodies to GFAP (red) and vimentin (green)

=== Macroglia ===
Derived from ectodermal tissue.

Location	Name	Description
CNS	Astrocytes	Astrocytes (also called astroglia) have a number of projections that link neurons to their blood supply while forming the blood–brain barrier. They regulate the external chemical environment of neurons by removing excess potassium ions and recycling neurotransmitters released during synaptic transmission. Astrocytes may regulate vasoconstriction and vasodilation by producing substances such as arachidonic acid, whose metabolites are vasoactive. Astrocytes signal each other using ATP. The gap junctions (also known as electrical synapses) between astrocytes allow the messenger molecule IP3 to diffuse from one astrocyte to another. IP3 activates calcium channels on cellular organelles, releasing calcium into the cytoplasm. This calcium may stimulate the production of more IP3 and cause release of ATP through channels in the membrane made of pannexins. The net effect is a calcium wave that propagates from cell to cell. Extracellular release of ATP and consequent activation of purinergic receptors on other astrocytes may also mediate calcium waves in some cases. In general, there are two types of astrocytes, protoplasmic and fibrous, similar in function but distinct in morphology and distribution. Protoplasmic astrocytes have short, thick, highly branched processes and are typically found in gray matter. Fibrous astrocytes have long, thin, less-branched processes and are more commonly found in white matter. It has recently been shown that astrocyte activity is linked to blood flow in the brain, and that this is what is actually being measured in fMRI. They also have been involved in neuronal circuits playing an inhibitory role after sensing changes in extracellular calcium. Human astrocytes are larger and more abundant than any other animals'.
CNS	Oligodendrocytes	Oligodendrocytes are cells that coat axons in the CNS with their cell membrane, forming a specialized membrane differentiation called myelin, producing the myelin sheath. The myelin sheath provides insulation to the axon that allows electrical signals to propagate more efficiently.
CNS	Ependymal cells	Ependymal cells, also named ependymocytes, line the spinal cord and the ventricular system of the brain. These cells are involved in the creation and secretion of cerebrospinal fluid (CSF) and beat their cilia to help circulate the CSF and make up the blood-CSF barrier. They are also thought to act as neural stem cells.
CNS	Radial glia	Radial glia cells arise from neuroepithelial cells after the onset of neurogenesis. Their differentiation abilities are more restricted than those of neuroepithelial cells. In the developing nervous system, radial glia function both as neuronal progenitors and as a scaffold upon which newborn neurons migrate. In the mature brain, the cerebellum and retina retain characteristic radial glial cells. In the cerebellum, these are Bergmann glia, which regulate synaptic plasticity. In the retina, the radial Müller cell is the glial cell that spans the thickness of the retina and, in addition to astroglial cells, participates in a bidirectional communication with neurons.
PNS	Schwann cells	Similar in function to oligodendrocytes, Schwann cells provide myelination to axons in the peripheral nervous system (PNS). They also have phagocytotic activity and clear cellular debris that allows for regrowth of PNS neurons.
PNS	Satellite cells	Satellite glial cells are small cells that surround neurons in sensory, sympathetic, and parasympathetic ganglia. These cells help regulate the external chemical environment. Like astrocytes, they are interconnected by gap junctions and respond to ATP by elevating the intracellular concentration of calcium ions. They are highly sensitive to injury and inflammation and appear to contribute to pathological states, such as chronic pain.
PNS	Enteric glial cells	Are found in the intrinsic ganglia of the digestive system. Glia cells are thought to have a number of roles in the enteric system, some related to homeostasis and muscular digestive processes.

=== Microglia ===
Microglia are specialized macrophages capable of phagocytosis that protect neurons of the central nervous system. They are derived from the earliest wave of mononuclear cells that originate in the blood islands of the yolk sac early in development, and colonize the brain shortly after the neural precursors begin to differentiate.

These cells are found in all regions of the brain and spinal cord. Microglial cells are small relative to macroglial cells, with changing shapes and oblong nuclei. They are mobile within the brain and multiply when the brain is damaged. In the healthy central nervous system, microglia processes constantly sample all aspects of their environment (neurons, macroglia and blood vessels). In a healthy brain, microglia direct the immune response to brain damage and play an important role in the inflammation that accompanies the damage. A number of diseases and disorders are associated with deficient microglia, such as Alzheimer's disease, Parkinson's disease and ALS.

=== Other ===
Pituicytes from the posterior pituitary are glial cells with characteristics in common to astrocytes. Tanycytes in the median eminence of the hypothalamus are a type of ependymal cell that descend from radial glia and line the base of the third ventricle. Drosophila melanogaster, the fruit fly, contains a number of glial types that are functionally similar to mammalian glia but are nonetheless classified differently.

=== Total number ===
In general, neuroglial cells are smaller than neurons. There are approximately 85 billion glial cells in the human brain, about the same number as neurons. Glial cells make up about half the total volume of the brain and spinal cord. The glia to neuron-ratio varies from one part of the brain to another. The glia to neuron-ratio in the cerebral cortex is 3.72 (60.84 billion glia (72%); 16.34 billion neurons), while that of the cerebellum is only 0.23 (16.04 billion glia; 69.03 billion neurons). The ratio in the cerebral cortex gray matter is 1.48, with 3.76 for the gray and white matter combined. The ratio of the basal ganglia, diencephalon and brainstem combined is 11.35.

The total number of glial cells in the human brain is distributed into the different types with oligodendrocytes being the most frequent (45–75%), followed by astrocytes (19–40%) and microglia (about 10% or less).

== Development ==
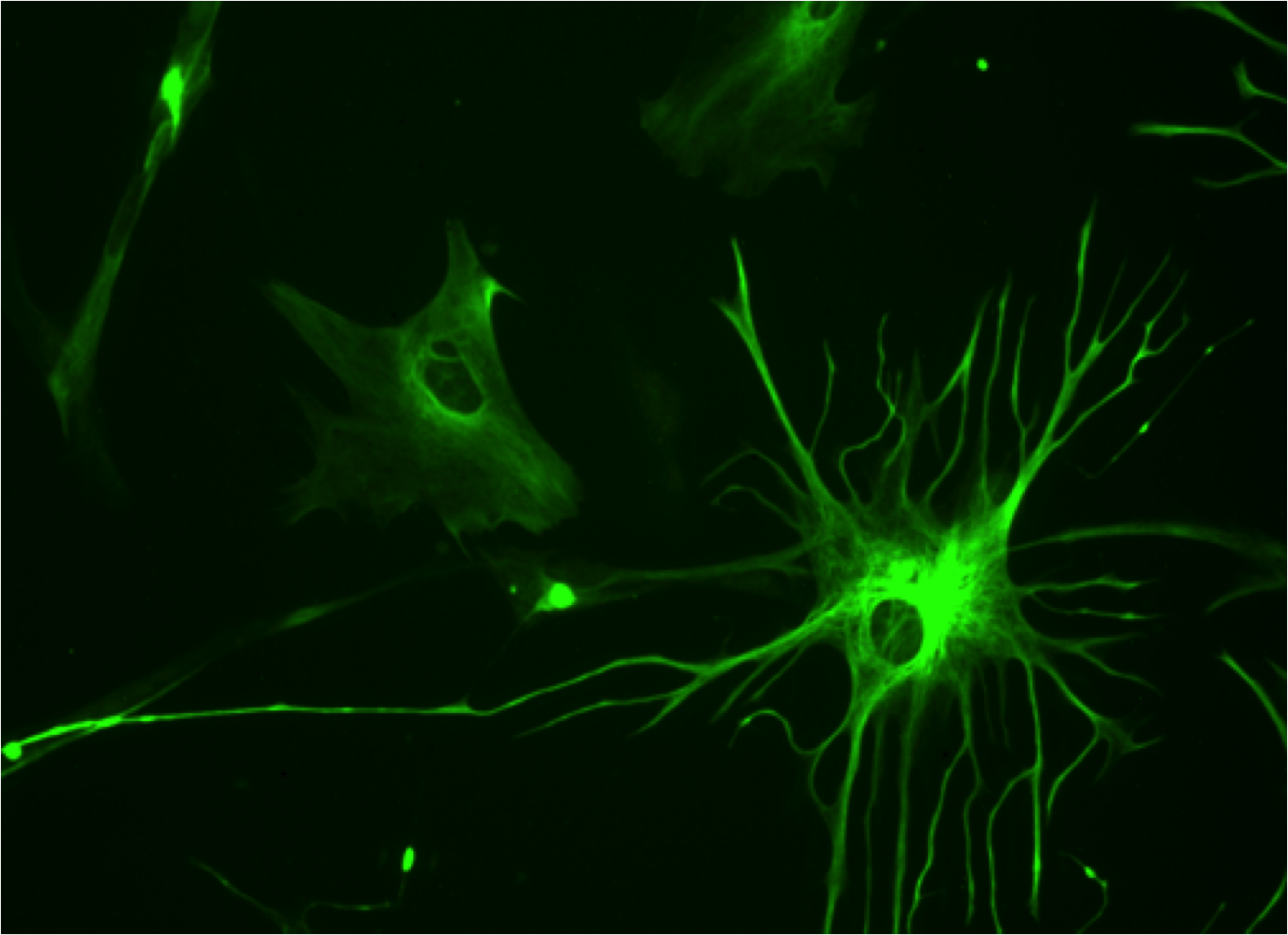
23-week fetal brain culture astrocyte

Most glia are derived from ectodermal tissue of the developing embryo, in particular the neural tube and crest. The exception is microglia, which are derived from hematopoietic stem cells. In the adult, microglia are largely a self-renewing population and are distinct from macrophages and monocytes, which infiltrate an injured and diseased CNS.

In the central nervous system, glia develop from the ventricular zone of the neural tube. These glia include the oligodendrocytes, ependymal cells, and astrocytes. In the peripheral nervous system, glia derive from the neural crest. These PNS glia include Schwann cells in nerves and satellite glial cells in ganglia.

=== Capacity to divide ===
Glia retain the ability to undergo cell divisions in adulthood, whereas most neurons cannot. The view is based on the general inability of the mature nervous system to replace neurons after an injury, such as a stroke or trauma, where often there is a substantial proliferation of glia, or gliosis, near or at the site of damage. However, detailed studies have found no evidence that 'mature' glia, such as astrocytes or oligodendrocytes, retain mitotic capacity. Only the resident oligodendrocyte precursor cells seem to keep this ability once the nervous system matures.

Glial cells are known to be capable of mitosis. By contrast, scientific understanding of whether neurons are permanently post-mitotic, or capable of mitosis, is still developing. In the past, glia had been considered to lack certain features of neurons. For example, glial cells were not believed to have chemical synapses or to release transmitters. They were considered to be the passive bystanders of neural transmission. However, recent studies have shown this to not be entirely true.

== Functions ==
Some glial cells function primarily as the physical support for neurons. Others provide nutrients to neurons and regulate the extracellular fluid of the brain, especially surrounding neurons and their synapses. During early embryogenesis, glial cells direct the migration of neurons and produce molecules that modify the growth of axons and dendrites. Some glial cells display regional diversity in the CNS and their functions may vary between the CNS regions.

=== Neuron repair and development ===
Glia are crucial in the development of the nervous system and in processes such as synaptic plasticity and synaptogenesis. Glia have a role in the regulation of repair of neurons after injury. In the central nervous system (CNS), glia suppress repair. Glial cells known as astrocytes enlarge and proliferate to form a scar and produce inhibitory molecules that inhibit regrowth of a damaged or severed axon. In the peripheral nervous system (PNS), glial cells known as Schwann cells (or also as neuri-lemmocytes) promote repair. After axonal injury, Schwann cells regress to an earlier developmental state to encourage regrowth of the axon. This difference between the CNS and the PNS, raises hopes for the regeneration of nervous tissue in the CNS. For example, a spinal cord may be able to be repaired following injury or severance.

=== Myelin sheath creation ===
Oligodendrocytes are found in the CNS and resemble an octopus: they have a bulbous cell body with up to fifteen arm-like processes. Each process reaches out to an axon and spirals around it, creating a myelin sheath. The myelin sheath insulates the nerve fiber from the extracellular fluid and speeds up signal conduction along the nerve fiber. In the peripheral nervous system, Schwann cells are responsible for myelin production. These cells envelop nerve fibers of the PNS by winding repeatedly around them. This process creates a myelin sheath, which not only aids in conductivity but also assists in the regeneration of damaged fibers.

=== Neurotransmission ===
Astrocytes are crucial participants in the tripartite synapse. They have several crucial functions, including clearance of neurotransmitters from within the synaptic cleft, which aids in distinguishing between separate action potentials and prevents toxic build-up of certain neurotransmitters such as glutamate, which would otherwise lead to excitotoxicity. Furthermore, astrocytes release gliotransmitters such as glutamate, ATP, and D-serine in response to stimulation.

== Clinical significance ==
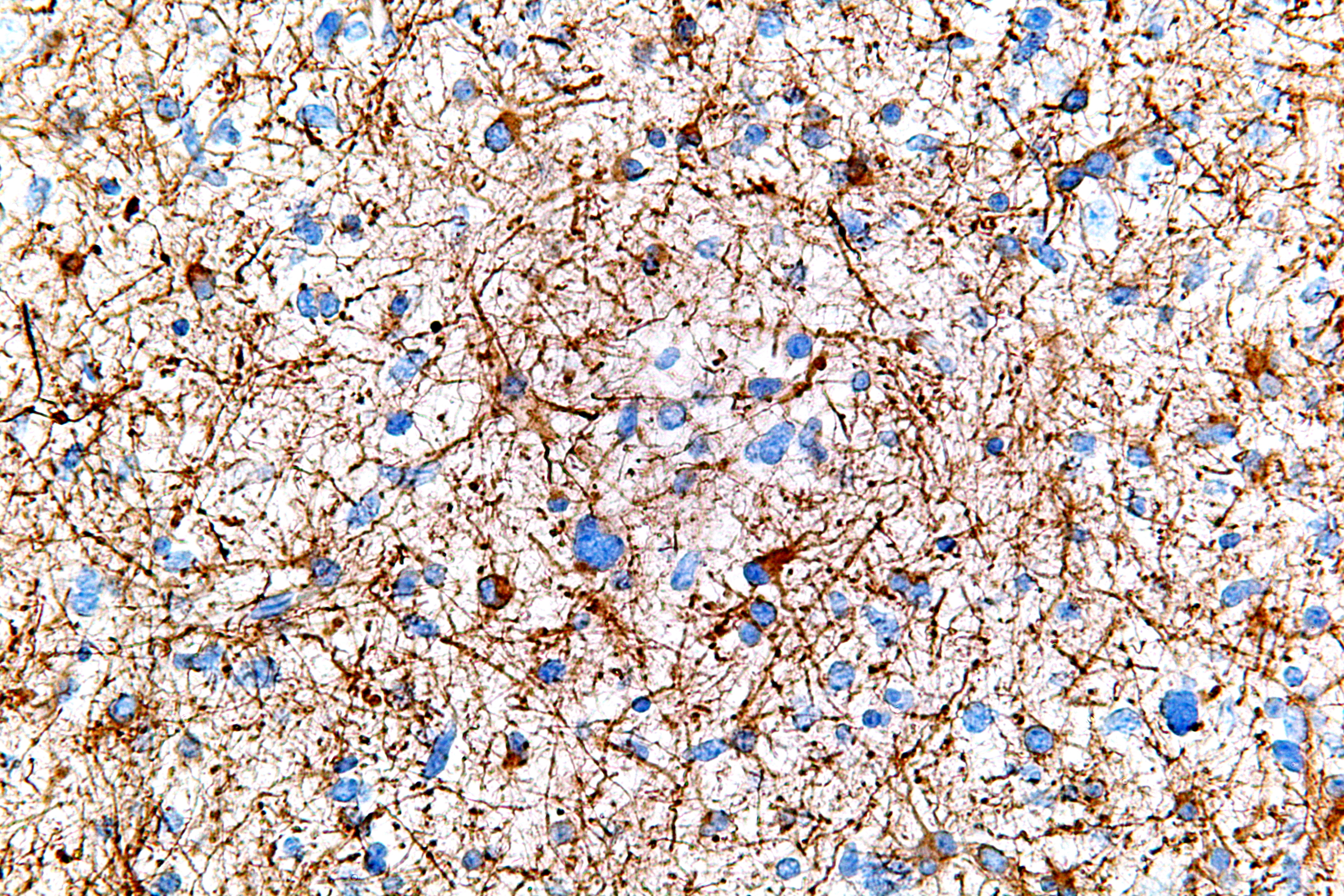
Neoplastic glial cells stained with an antibody against GFAP (brown), from a brain biopsy

While glial cells in the PNS frequently assist in regeneration of lost neural functioning, loss of neurons in the CNS does not result in a similar reaction from neuroglia. In the CNS, regrowth will only happen if the trauma was mild, and not severe. When severe trauma presents itself, the survival of the remaining neurons becomes the optimal solution. However, some studies investigating the role of glial cells in Alzheimer's disease are beginning to contradict the usefulness of this feature, and even claim it can "exacerbate" the disease. In addition to affecting the potential repair of neurons in Alzheimer's disease, scarring and inflammation from glial cells have been further implicated in the degeneration of neurons caused by amyotrophic lateral sclerosis.

In addition to neurodegenerative diseases, a wide range of harmful exposure, such as hypoxia, or physical trauma, can lead to the result of physical damage to the CNS. Generally, when damage occurs to the CNS, glial cells cause apoptosis among the surrounding cellular bodies. Then, there is a large amount of microglial activity, which results in inflammation, and, finally, there is a heavy release of growth inhibiting molecules.

== History ==
Although glial cells and neurons were probably first observed at the same time in the early 19th century, unlike neurons whose morphological and physiological properties were directly observable for the first investigators of the nervous system, glial cells had been considered to be merely "glue" that held neurons together until the mid-20th century.

Glia were first described in 1856 by the pathologist Rudolf Virchow in a comment to his 1846 publication on connective tissue. A more detailed description of glial cells was provided in the 1858 book 'Cellular Pathology' by the same author.

When markers for different types of cells were analyzed, Albert Einstein's brain was discovered to contain significantly more glia than normal brains in the left angular gyrus, an area thought to be responsible for mathematical processing and language. However, out of the total of 28 statistical comparisons between Einstein's brain and the control brains, finding one statistically significant result is not surprising, and the claim that Einstein's brain is different is not scientific (cf. multiple comparisons problem).

Not only does the ratio of glia to neurons increase through evolution, but so does the size of the glia. Astroglial cells in human brains have a volume 27 times greater than in mouse brains.

These important scientific findings may begin to shift the neurocentric perspective into a more holistic view of the brain which encompasses the glial cells as well. For the majority of the twentieth century, scientists had disregarded glial cells as mere physical scaffolds for neurons. Recent publications have proposed that the number of glial cells in the brain is correlated with the intelligence of a species. Moreover, evidences are demonstrating the active role of glia, in particular astroglia, in cognitive processes like learning and memory.

== See also ==
- Oligodendrocyte progenitor cell
- List of human cell types derived from the germ layers
