= CD24 =

Mammalian protein found in humans

Identifiers
- Aliases: CD24, CD24A, CD24 molecule
- External IDs: OMIM: 600074; MGI: 88323; GeneCards: CD24

Gene location (Human)
Chr.	Chromosome 6 (human)
Band	6q21	Start	106,969,831 bp
Band	6q21	End	106,975,627 bp

Gene location (Mouse)
Chr.	Chromosome 10 (mouse)
Band	10 B2|10 23.01 cM	Start	43,454,280 bp
Band	10 B2|10 23.01 cM	End	43,460,261 bp
RNA expression pattern
Bgee	Human / Mouse (ortholog); Top expressed in: renal medulla; bronchial epithelial cell; mucosa of colon; mucosa of sigmoid colon; oral cavity; parotid gland; gingival epithelium; epithelium of nasopharynx; mucosa of ileum; pancreatic epithelial cell / Top expressed in: fetal liver hematopoietic progenitor cell; crypt of lieberkuhn of small intestine; superior cervical ganglion; epithelium of stomach; human fetus; medial ganglionic eminence; epithelium of lens; parotid gland; tibiofemoral joint; blood; More reference expression data
BioGPS	n/a
Gene ontology
Molecular function	protein tyrosine kinase activator activity; signal transducer activity; protein binding; protein kinase binding
Cellular component	membrane; plasma membrane; cell surface; anchored component of external side of plasma membrane; membrane raft; anchored component of membrane; intracellular anatomical structure
Biological process	response to hypoxia; regulation of MAPK cascade; positive regulation of MAP kinase activity; regulation of cytokine-mediated signaling pathway; positive regulation of cytosolic calcium ion concentration; chemokine receptor transport out of membrane raft; T cell costimulation; regulation of phosphorylation; Wnt signaling pathway; negative regulation of transforming growth factor beta3 production; cell activation; immune response-regulating cell surface receptor signaling pathway; response to estrogen; respiratory burst; intrinsic apoptotic signaling pathway; glomerular parietal epithelial cell differentiation; cell adhesion; glomerular visceral epithelial cell differentiation; cholesterol homeostasis; regulation of epithelial cell differentiation; response to molecule of bacterial origin; cell migration; B cell receptor transport into membrane raft; positive regulation of nephron tubule epithelial cell differentiation; positive regulation of activated T cell proliferation; positive regulation of protein tyrosine kinase activity; cell-cell adhesion
Sources:Amigo / QuickGO
Orthologs
Databases	NCBI: entry; OMA: entry
Species	Human	Mouse
Entrez	100133941	12484
Ensembl	ENSG00000272398	ENSMUSG00000047139
UniProt	P25063	P24807
RefSeq (mRNA)	NM_001291737; NM_001291738; NM_001291739; NM_013230; NM_001359084	NM_009846
RefSeq (protein)	NP_001278666; NP_001278667; NP_001278668; NP_037362; NP_001346013	NP_033976
Location (UCSC)	Chr 6: 106.97 – 106.98 Mb	Chr 10: 43.45 – 43.46 Mb
PubMed search
- Wikidata
View/Edit Human	View/Edit Mouse

Signal transducer CD24 also known as cluster of differentiation 24 or heat stable antigen CD24 (HSA) is a protein that in humans is encoded by the CD24 gene. CD24 is a cell adhesion molecule.

== Function ==
CD24 is a sialoglycoprotein expressed at the surface of most B lymphocytes and differentiating neuroblasts. It is also expressed on neutrophils and neutrophil precursors from the myelocyte stage onwards. The encoded protein is anchored via a glycosyl phosphatidylinositol (GPI) link to the cell surface. The protein also contributes to a wide range of downstream signaling networks and is crucial for neural development. Cross-linking of CD24 on the surface of neutrophils induces apoptosis, and this appears to be defective in sepsis. CD24 gene is found on chromosome 6 (6q21) An alignment of this gene's sequence finds genomic locations with similarity on chromosomes 1p36, 3p26, 15q21.3, 20q11.2 and Yq11.222. Whether transcription, and corresponding translation, occurs at each of these other genomic locations needs to be experimentally determined.

Researchers have identified CD24 as a novel cell surface marker that flags anastasis in melanoma cells, a process where cells that have initiated apoptosis can recover and survive. This discovery highlights CD24’s role in marking apoptotic subpopulations that exhibit metabolic activity and proliferative capacities, contributing to melanoma’s resilience and potential metastasis.
