= Leptin =

Hormone that inhibits hunger

LEP
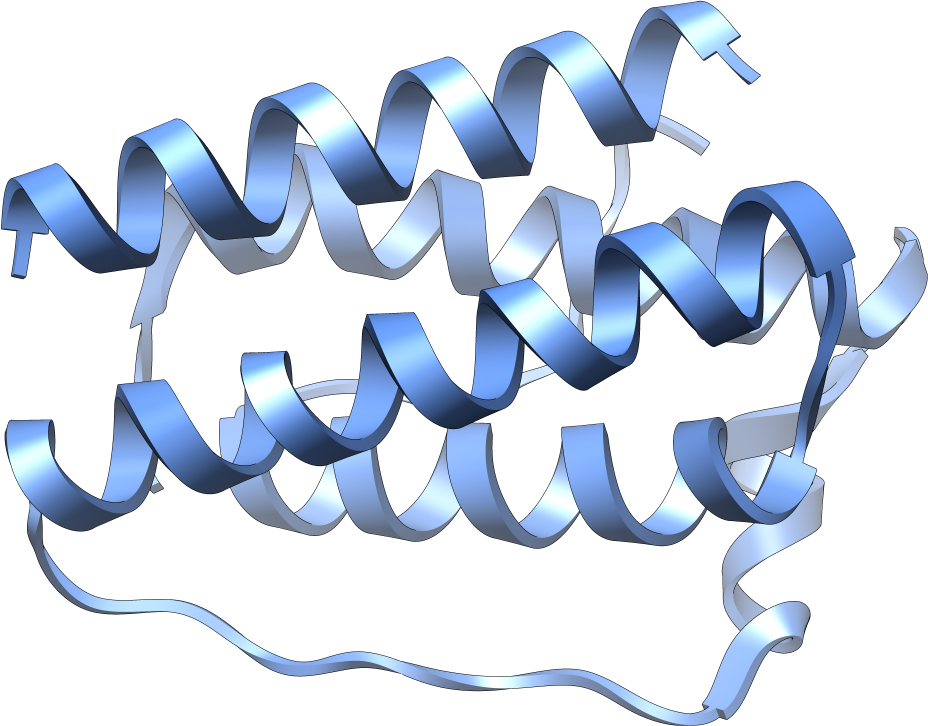

Identifiers
- Aliases: LEP, LEPD, OB, OBS, leptin
- External IDs: OMIM: 164160; MGI: 104663; GeneCards: LEP
Available structures
PDB	Ortholog search: PDBe RCSB
PDB	List of PDB id codes 1AX8

Gene location (Human)
Chr.	Chromosome 7 (human)
Band	7q32.1	Start	128,241,278 bp
Band	7q32.1	End	128,257,629 bp

Gene location (Mouse)
Chr.	Chromosome 6 (mouse)
Band	6 A3.3|6 12.3 cM	Start	29,060,219 bp
Band	6 A3.3|6 12.3 cM	End	29,073,876 bp
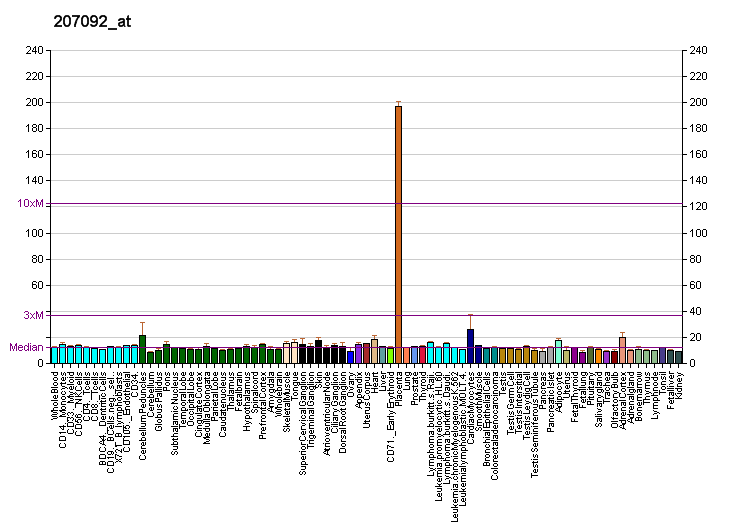
RNA expression pattern
Bgee	Human / Mouse (ortholog); Top expressed in: skin of hip; buccal mucosa cell; subcutaneous adipose tissue; lactiferous gland; lactiferous duct; abdominal fat; pericardium; placenta; synovial joint; parotid gland / Top expressed in: lactiferous gland; white adipose tissue; subcutaneous adipose tissue; Ileal epithelium; brown adipose tissue; muscle of thigh; embryo; ankle; tunica adventitia of aorta; intercostal muscle; More reference expression data
BioGPS	More reference expression data
Gene ontology
Molecular function	hormone activity; peptide hormone receptor binding; signaling receptor binding
Cellular component	cytoplasm; extracellular region; extracellular space
Biological process	regulation of protein phosphorylation; response to dietary excess; cellular response to retinoic acid; positive regulation of developmental growth; negative regulation of glucagon secretion; placenta development; cardiac muscle hypertrophy; regulation of angiogenesis; prostaglandin secretion; regulation of intestinal cholesterol absorption; T cell differentiation; positive regulation of reactive oxygen species metabolic process; central nervous system neuron development; circadian rhythm; positive regulation of ion transport; angiogenesis; glucose metabolic process; positive regulation of peroxisome proliferator activated receptor signaling pathway; positive regulation of hepatic stellate cell activation; regulation of endothelial cell proliferation; intestinal absorption; response to ethanol; negative regulation of autophagy; positive regulation of p38MAPK cascade; positive regulation of protein kinase B signaling; negative regulation of metabolic process; negative regulation of vasoconstriction; glucose homeostasis; regulation of insulin secretion; regulation of steroid biosynthetic process; insulin secretion; regulation of natural killer cell activation; regulation of fat cell differentiation; response to vitamin E; response to nutrient levels; bone mineralization involved in bone maturation; positive regulation of T cell proliferation; positive regulation of protein import into nucleus; regulation of brown fat cell differentiation; fatty acid beta-oxidation; regulation of metabolic process; hormone metabolic process; positive regulation of MAPK cascade; positive regulation of TOR signaling; cellular response to L-ascorbic acid; ovulation from ovarian follicle; activation of protein kinase C activity; sexual reproduction; negative regulation of cartilage development; response to nutrient; negative regulation of glutamine transport; leptin-mediated signaling pathway; bile acid metabolic process; female pregnancy; negative regulation of apoptotic process; cholesterol metabolic process; positive regulation of follicle-stimulating hormone secretion; negative regulation of transcription by RNA polymerase II; negative regulation of appetite; regulation of protein localization to nucleus; regulation of blood pressure; negative regulation of glucose import; leukocyte tethering or rolling; negative regulation of lipid storage; adipose tissue development; positive regulation of insulin receptor signaling pathway; bone growth; positive regulation of receptor signaling pathway via JAK-STAT; glycerol biosynthetic process; positive regulation of luteinizing hormone secretion; fatty acid catabolic process; regulation of gluconeogenesis; response to estradiol; intracellular signal transduction; adult feeding behavior; response to hypoxia; regulation of natural killer cell proliferation; eating behavior; positive regulation of cytokine production; regulation of cytokine production involved in inflammatory response; regulation of nitric-oxide synthase activity; response to activity; cellular response to leptin stimulus; regulation of cell cycle; regulation of natural killer cell mediated cytotoxicity; positive regulation of fat cell apoptotic process; positive regulation of cell population proliferation; regulation of lipoprotein lipid oxidation; positive regulation of phosphatidylinositol 3-kinase signaling; signal transduction; regulation of bone remodeling; lipid metabolism; negative regulation of appetite by leptin-mediated signaling pathway; interleukin-12 production; positive regulation of tumor necrosis factor production; interleukin-6 production; response to insulin; tyrosine phosphorylation of STAT protein; phagocytosis; energy reserve metabolic process; positive regulation of tyrosine phosphorylation of STAT protein; regulation of signaling receptor activity; determination of adult lifespan; regulation of lipid biosynthetic process; positive regulation of cold-induced thermogenesis; aorta development; regulation of catalytic activity; elastin metabolic process
Sources:Amigo / QuickGO
Orthologs
Databases	NCBI: entry; OMA: entry
Species	Human	Mouse
Entrez	3952	16846
Ensembl	ENSG00000174697	ENSMUSG00000059201
UniProt	P41159	P41160
RefSeq (mRNA)	NM_000230	NM_008493
RefSeq (protein)	NP_000221	NP_032519
Location (UCSC)	Chr 7: 128.24 – 128.26 Mb	Chr 6: 29.06 – 29.07 Mb
PubMed search
- Wikidata
View/Edit Human	View/Edit Mouse

Leptin
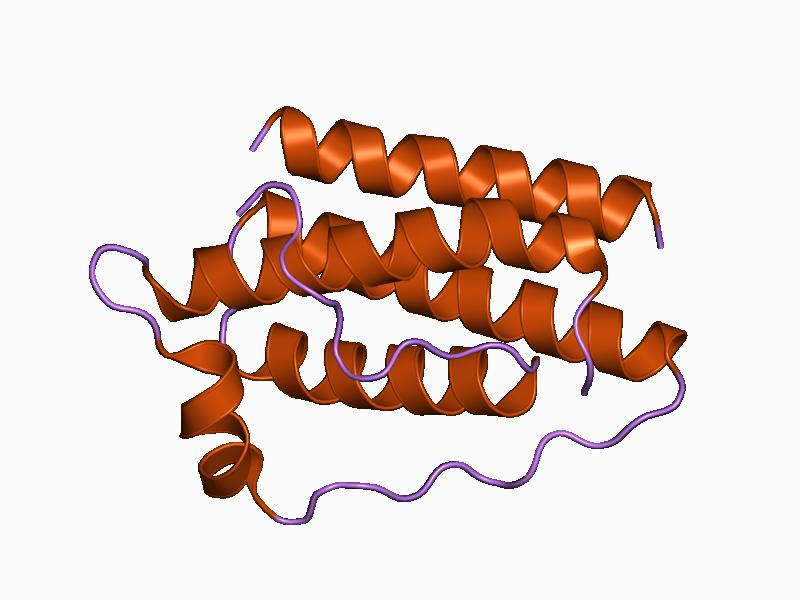
- Structure of the obese protein leptin-E100

Identifiers
- Symbol: Leptin
- Pfam: PF02024
- Pfam clan: CL0053
- InterPro: IPR000065
- SCOP2: 1ax8 / SCOPe / SUPFAM
Available protein structures:
- PDB: 1ax8 IPR000065 PF02024 (ECOD; PDBsum)
- AlphaFold: IPR000065; PF02024

Leptin (from Greek λεπτός leptos, "thin" or "light" or "small"), also known as obese protein, is a protein hormone predominantly made by adipocytes (cells of adipose tissue). Its primary role is likely to regulate long-term energy balance.

As one of the major signals of energy status, leptin levels influence appetite, satiety, and motivated behaviors oriented toward the maintenance of energy reserves (e.g., feeding, foraging behaviors).

The amount of circulating leptin correlates with the amount of energy reserves, mainly triglycerides stored in adipose tissue. High leptin levels are interpreted by the brain that energy reserves are high, whereas low leptin levels indicate that energy reserves are low, in the process adapting the organism to starvation through a variety of metabolic, endocrine, neurobiochemical, and behavioral changes.

Leptin is coded for by the LEP gene. Leptin receptors are expressed by a variety of brain and peripheral cell types. These include cell receptors in the arcuate and ventromedial nuclei, as well as other parts of the hypothalamus and dopaminergic neurons of the ventral tegmental area, consequently mediating feeding.

Although regulation of fat stores is deemed to be the primary function of leptin, it also plays a role in other physiological processes, as evidenced by its many sites of synthesis other than fat cells, and the many cell types beyond hypothalamic cells that have leptin receptors. Many of these additional functions are yet to be fully defined.

In obesity, a decreased sensitivity to leptin occurs (similar to insulin resistance in type 2 diabetes), resulting in an inability to detect satiety despite high energy stores and high levels of leptin.

== Effects ==
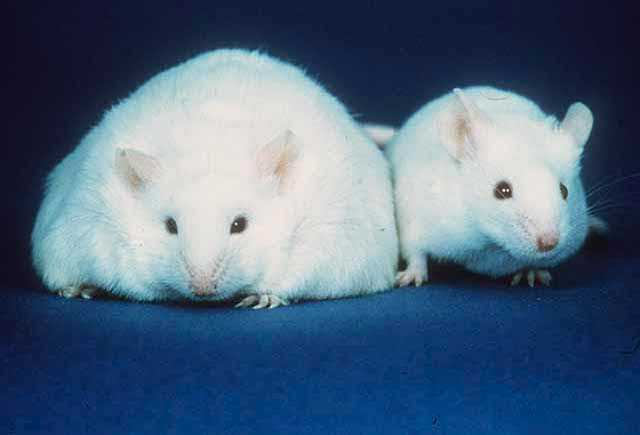
A comparison of a mouse unable to produce leptin, resulting in obesity, constant hunger, and lethargy (left), to an active normal weight mouse (right)

Predominantly, the "energy expenditure hormone" leptin is made by adipose cells, and is thus labeled fat cell-specific. In the context of its effects, the adjectives central, direct, and primary are not used interchangeably. In regard to the hormone leptin, central vs peripheral refers to the hypothalamic portion of the brain vs non-hypothalamic location of action of leptin; direct vs indirect refers to whether there is no intermediary, or there is an intermediary in the mode of action of leptin; and primary vs secondary is an arbitrary description of a particular function of leptin.

Location of action
The central location of action (effect) of the fat cell-specific hormone leptin is the hypothalamus, a part of the brain and thus of the central nervous system. Non-hypothalamic targets of leptin are referred to as peripheral targets. There is a different relative importance of central and peripheral leptin interactions under different physiologic states, and variations among species.

Mode of action
Leptin acts directly on leptin receptors in the cell membrane of different types of cells in the human body in particular, and in vertebrates in general. The leptin receptor is found on a wide range of cell types. It is a single-transmembrane-domain type I cytokine receptor, a special class of cytokine receptors. Further, leptin interacts with other hormones and energy regulators, indirectly mediating the effects of: insulin, glucagon, insulin-like growth factor, growth hormone, glucocorticoids, cytokines, and metabolites.

Function
The primary function of the hormone leptin is the regulation of adipose tissue mass through central hypothalamus mediated effects on hunger, food energy use, physical exercise, and energy balance. Outside the brain, in the periphery of the body, leptin's secondary functions are: modulation of energy expenditure, modulation between fetal and maternal metabolism, and that of a permissive factor in puberty, activator of immune cells, activator of beta islet cells, and growth factor.

=== Central nervous system ===
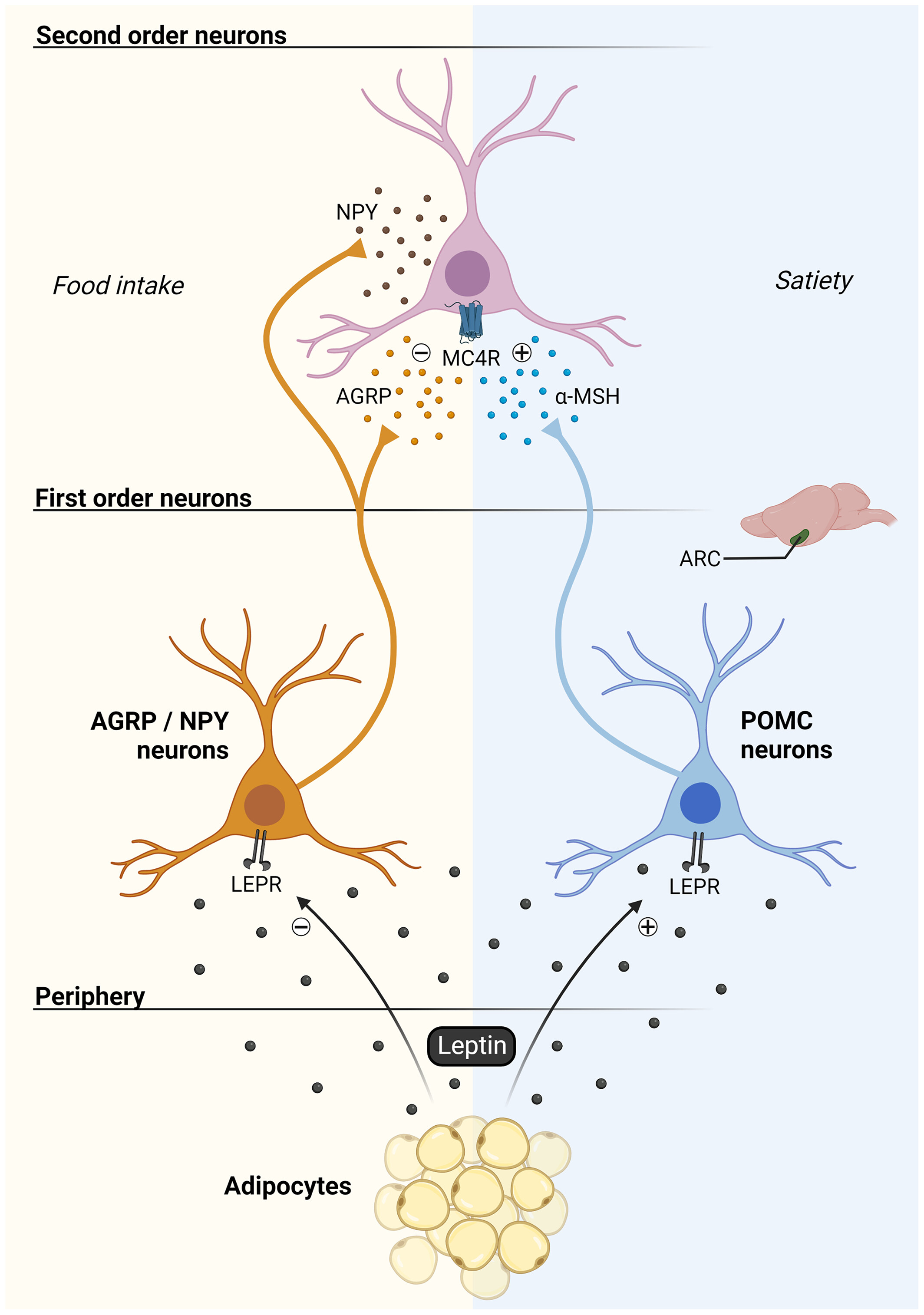
Classic leptin–melanocortin model

In vertebrates, the nervous system consists of two main parts, the central nervous system (CNS) and the peripheral nervous system (PNS). The primary effect of leptins is in the hypothalamus, a part of the central nervous system. Leptin receptors are expressed not only in the hypothalamus but also in other brain regions, particularly in the hippocampus. Thus some leptin receptors in the brain are classified as central (hypothalamic) and some as peripheral (non-hypothalamic).

As scientifically known so far, the general effects of leptin in the central nervous system are:

- Deficiency of leptin has been shown to alter brain proteins and neuronal functions of obese mice that can be restored by leptin injection
- Leptin receptor signaling in the hippocampus enhances learning and memory Treatment with leptin has been shown to enhance learning and memory in animal models.
- In humans, low circulating plasma leptin has been associated with cognitive changes associated with anorexia, depression, and Alzheimer's Disease
- Studies in transgenic mouse models of Alzheimer's disease have shown that chronic administration of leptin can ameliorate brain pathology and improve cognitive performance, by reducing b-amyloid and hyperphosphorylated Tau, two hallmarks of Alzheimer's pathology.

Generally, leptin is thought to enter the brain at the choroid plexus, where the intense expression of a form of leptin receptor molecule could act as a transport mechanism.

Increased levels of melatonin causes a downregulation of leptin, however, melatonin also appears to increase leptin levels in the presence of insulin, therefore causing a decrease in appetite during sleeping. Partial sleep deprivation has also been associated with decreased leptin levels.

Mice with type 1 diabetes treated with leptin or leptin plus insulin, compared to insulin alone had better metabolic profiles: blood sugar did not fluctuate so much; cholesterol levels decreased; less body fat formed.

==== Hypothalamus ====
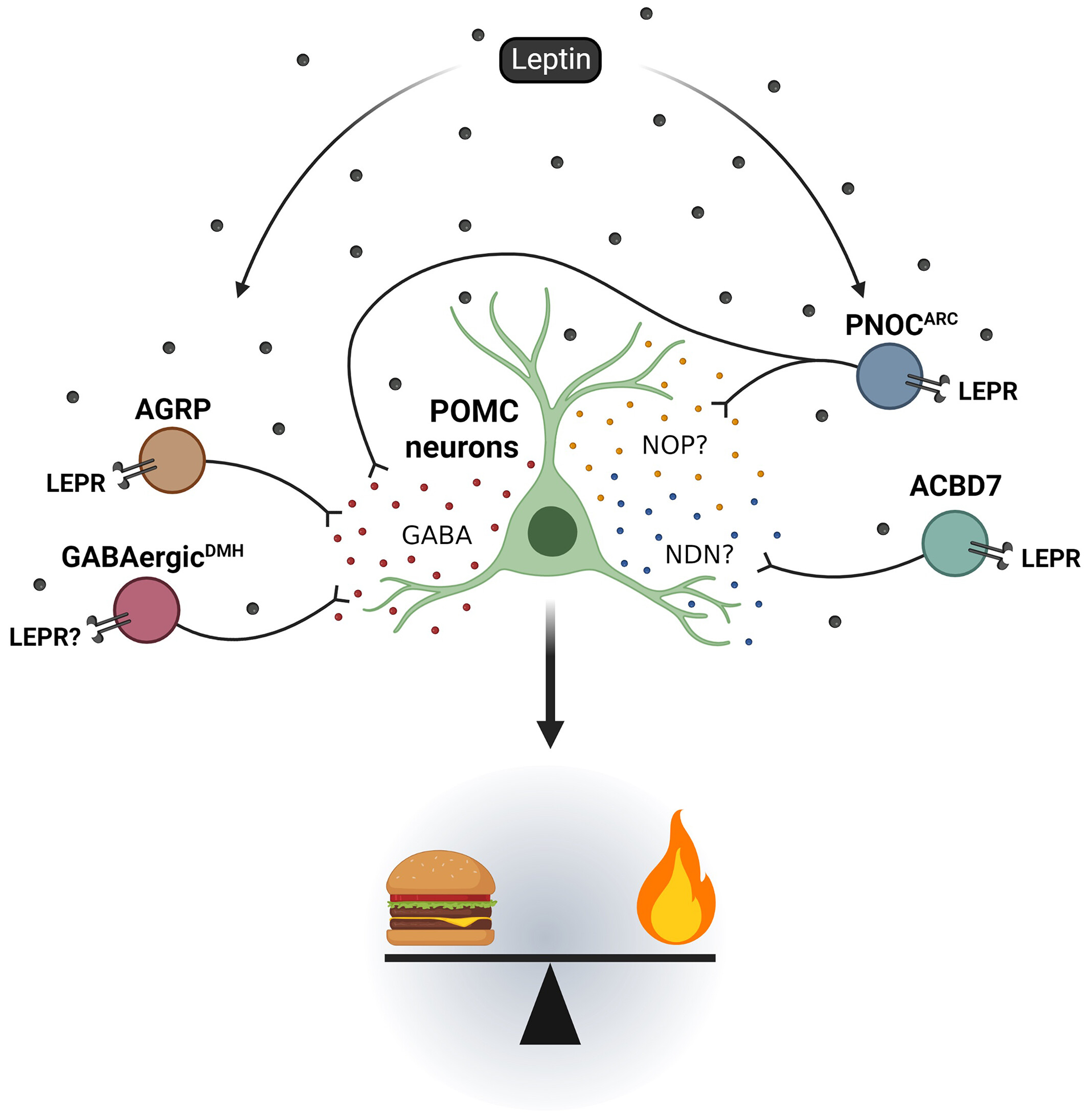
Summary of the different ways leptin can indirectly affect POMC neurons

Leptin acts on receptors in the lateral hypothalamus to inhibit hunger and the medial hypothalamus to stimulate satiety.

- In the lateral hypothalamus, leptin inhibits hunger by
  - counteracting the effects of neuropeptide Y, a potent hunger promoter secreted by cells in the gut and in the hypothalamus
  - counteracting the effects of anandamide, another potent hunger promoter that binds to the same receptors as THC
- In the medial hypothalamus, leptin stimulates satiety by
  - promoting the synthesis of α-MSH, a hunger suppressant

Thus, a lesion in the lateral hypothalamus causes anorexia (due to a lack of hunger signals) and a lesion in the medial hypothalamus causes excessive hunger (due to a lack of satiety signals). This appetite inhibition is long-term, in contrast to the rapid inhibition of hunger by cholecystokinin (CCK) and the slower suppression of hunger between meals mediated by PYY3-36. The absence of leptin (or its receptor) leads to uncontrolled hunger and resulting obesity. Fasting or following a very-low-calorie diet lowers leptin levels. Leptin levels change more when food intake decreases than when it increases. The dynamics of leptin due to an acute change in energy balance may be related to appetite and eventually, to food intake rather than fat stores.

- It controls food intake and energy expenditure by acting on receptors in the mediobasal hypothalamus.

Leptin binds to neuropeptide Y (NPY) neurons in the arcuate nucleus in such a way as to decrease the activity of these neurons. Leptin signals to the hypothalamus which produces a feeling of satiety. Moreover, leptin signals may make it easier for people to resist the temptation of foods high in calories.

Leptin receptor activation inhibits neuropeptide Y and agouti-related peptide (AgRP), and activates α-melanocyte-stimulating hormone (α-MSH). The NPY neurons are a key element in the regulation of hunger; small doses of NPY injected into the brains of experimental animals stimulates feeding, while selective destruction of the NPY neurons in mice causes them to become anorexic. Conversely, α-MSH is an important mediator of satiety, and differences in the gene for the α-MSH receptor are linked to obesity in humans.

Leptin interacts with six types of receptors (Ob-Ra–Ob-Rf, or LepRa-LepRf), which in turn are encoded by a single gene, LEPR. Ob-Rb is the only receptor isoform that can signal intracellularly via the JAK-STAT and MAPK signal transduction pathways, and is present in hypothalamic nuclei.

Once leptin has bound to the Ob-Rb receptor, it activates the stat3, which is phosphorylated and travels to the nucleus to effect changes in gene expression, one of the main effects being the down-regulation of the expression of endocannabinoids, responsible for increasing hunger. In response to leptin, receptor neurons have been shown to remodel themselves, changing the number and types of synapses that fire onto them.

=== Circulatory system ===
The role of leptin/leptin receptors in modulation of T cell activity and the innate immune system was shown in experimentation with mice. It modulates the immune response to atherosclerosis, of which obesity is a predisposing and exercise a mitigating factor.

Exogenous leptin can promote angiogenesis by increasing vascular endothelial growth factor levels.

Hyperleptinemia produced by infusion or adenoviral gene transfer decreases blood pressure in rats.

Leptin microinjections into the nucleus of the solitary tract (NTS) have been shown to elicit sympathoexcitatory responses, and potentiate the cardiovascular responses to activation of the chemoreflex.

=== Fetal lung ===
In fetal lung, leptin is induced in the alveolar interstitial fibroblasts ("lipofibroblasts") by the action of PTHrP secreted by formative alveolar epithelium (endoderm) under moderate stretch. The leptin from the mesenchyme, in turn, acts back on the epithelium at the leptin receptor carried in the alveolar type II pneumocytes and induces surfactant expression, which is one of the main functions of these type II pneumocytes.

=== Reproductive system ===
==== Ovulatory cycle ====
In mice, and to a lesser extent in humans, leptin is required for male and female fertility. Ovulatory cycles in females are linked to energy balance (positive or negative depending on whether a female is losing or gaining weight) and energy flux (how much energy is consumed and expended) much more than energy status (fat levels). When energy balance is highly negative (meaning the woman is starving) or energy flux is very high (meaning the woman is exercising at extreme levels, but still consuming enough calories), the ovarian cycle stops and females stop menstruating. Only if a female has an extremely low body fat percentage does energy status affect menstruation. Leptin levels outside an ideal range may have a negative effect on egg quality and outcome during in vitro fertilization. Leptin is involved in reproduction by stimulating gonadotropin-releasing hormone from the hypothalamus.

==== Pregnancy ====
The placenta produces leptin. Leptin levels rise during pregnancy and fall after childbirth. Leptin is also expressed in fetal membranes and the uterine tissue. Uterine contractions are inhibited by leptin. Leptin plays a role in hyperemesis gravidarum (severe morning sickness of pregnancy), in polyendocrine metabolic ovarian syndrome (PMOS), and hypothalamic leptin is implicated in bone growth in mice.

==== Lactation ====
Immunoreactive leptin has been found in human breast milk; and leptin from mother's milk has been found in the blood of suckling infant animals.

==== Puberty ====
Leptin along with kisspeptin controls the onset of puberty. High levels of leptin, as usually observed in obese females, can trigger neuroendocrine cascade resulting in early menarche. This may eventually lead to shorter stature as oestrogen secretion starts during menarche and causes early closure of epiphyses.

=== Bone ===
Leptin's role in regulating bone mass was identified in 2000. Leptin can affect bone metabolism via direct signalling from the brain. Leptin decreases cancellous bone, but increases cortical bone. This "cortical-cancellous dichotomy" may represent a mechanism for enlarging bone size, and thus bone resistance, to cope with increased body weight.

Bone metabolism can be regulated by central sympathetic outflow, since sympathetic pathways innervate bone tissue. A number of brain-signalling molecules (neuropeptides and neurotransmitters) have been found in bone, including adrenaline, noradrenaline, serotonin, calcitonin gene-related peptide, vasoactive intestinal peptide, and neuropeptide Y. Leptin binds to its receptors in the hypothalamus, where it acts through the sympathetic nervous system to regulate bone metabolism. Leptin may also act directly on bone metabolism via a balance between energy intake and the IGF-I pathway. There is a potential for treatment of diseases of bone formation - such as impaired fracture healing - with leptin.

=== Immune system ===
Factors that acutely affect leptin levels are also factors that influence other markers of inflammation, e.g., testosterone, sleep, emotional stress, caloric restriction, and body fat levels. While it is well-established that leptin is involved in the regulation of the inflammatory response, it has been further theorized that leptin's role as an inflammatory marker is to respond specifically to adipose-derived inflammatory cytokines.

In terms of both structure and function, leptin resembles IL-6 and is a member of the cytokine superfamily. Circulating leptin seems to affect the HPA axis, suggesting a role for leptin in stress response. Elevated leptin concentrations are associated with elevated white blood cell counts in both men and women.

Similar to what is observed in chronic inflammation, chronically elevated leptin levels are associated with obesity, overeating, and inflammation-related diseases, including hypertension, metabolic syndrome, and cardiovascular disease. While leptin is associated with body fat mass, the size of individual fat cells, and overeating, it is not affected by exercise (for comparison, IL-6 is released in response to muscular contractions). Thus, it is speculated that leptin responds specifically to adipose-derived inflammation. Leptin is a pro-angiogenic, pro-inflammatory, and mitogenic factor, the actions of which are reinforced through crosstalk with IL-1 family cytokines in cancer. High leptin levels have been also demonstrated in patients with COVID-19 pneumonia.

Taken as such, increases in leptin levels (in response to caloric intake) function as an acute pro-inflammatory response mechanism to prevent excessive cellular stress induced by overeating. When high caloric intake overtaxes the ability of fat cells to grow larger or increase in number in step with caloric intake, the ensuing stress response leads to inflammation at the cellular level and ectopic fat storage, i.e., the unhealthy storage of body fat within internal organs, arteries, and/or muscle. The insulin increase in response to the caloric load provokes a dose-dependent rise in leptin, an effect potentiated by high cortisol levels. (This insulin-leptin relationship is notably similar to insulin's effect on the increase of IL-6 gene expression and secretion from preadipocytes in a time- and dose-dependent manner.) Furthermore, plasma leptin concentrations have been observed to gradually increase when acipimox is administered to prevent lipolysis, concurrent hypocaloric dieting and weight loss notwithstanding. Such findings appear to demonstrate high caloric loads in excess of storage rate capacities of fat cells lead to stress responses that induce an increase in leptin, which then operates as an adipose-derived inflammation stopgap signaling for the cessation of food intake so as to prevent adipose-derived inflammation from reaching elevated levels. This response may then protect against the harmful process of ectopic fat storage, which perhaps explains the connection between chronically elevated leptin levels and ectopic fat storage in obese individuals.

Leptin increases the production of leukocytes via actions on the hematopoietic niche, a pathway that is more active in sedentary mice and humans when compared to individuals who are physically active.

== Location of gene and structure of hormone ==
The Ob(Lep) gene (Ob for obese, Lep for leptin) is located on chromosome 7 in humans. Human leptin is a 16-kDa protein of 167 amino acids.

== Mutations ==
A human mutant leptin was first described in 1997, and subsequently six additional mutations were described. All of those affected were from Eastern countries; and all had variants of leptin not detected by the standard immunoreactive technique, so leptin levels were low or undetectable. The most recently described eighth mutation reported in January 2015, in a child with Turkish parents, is unique in that it is detected by the standard immunoreactive technique, where leptin levels are elevated; but the leptin does not turn on the leptin receptor, hence the patient has functional leptin deficiency. These eight mutations all cause extreme obesity in infancy, with hyperphagia.

=== Nonsense ===
A nonsense mutation in the leptin gene that results in a stop codon and lack of leptin production was first observed in mice. In the mouse gene, arginine-105 is encoded by CGA and only requires one nucleotide change to create the stop codon TGA. The corresponding amino acid in humans is encoded by the sequence CGG and would require two nucleotides to be changed to produce a stop codon, which is much less likely to happen.

=== Frameshift ===
A recessive frameshift mutation resulting in a reduction of leptin has been observed in two consanguineous children with juvenile obesity. A 2001 study of 13 people with a heterozygous frameshift mutation known as delta-G133 found that they had lower blood leptin levels than controls. There was an increased rate of obesity in these individuals, with 76% having a BMI of more than 30 compared to 26% in the control group.

=== Polymorphisms ===
A Human Genome Equivalent (HuGE) review in 2004 looked at studies of the connection between genetic mutations affecting leptin regulation and obesity. They reviewed a common polymorphism in the leptin gene (A19G; frequency 0.46), three mutations in the leptin receptor gene (Q223R, K109R, and K656N) and two mutations in the PPARG gene (P12A and C161T). They found no association between any of the polymorphisms and obesity.

A 2006 study found a link between the common LEP-2548 G/A genotype and morbid obesity in Taiwanese aborigines, but a 2014 meta-analysis did not, however, this polymorphism has been associated with weight gain in patients taking antipsychotics.

The LEP-2548 G/A polymorphism has been linked with an increased risk of prostate cancer, gestational diabetes, and osteoporosis.

Other rare polymorphisms have been found, but their association with obesity are not consistent.

=== Transversion ===
A single case of a homozygous transversion mutation of the gene encoding for leptin was reported in January 2015. It leads to functional leptin deficiency with high leptin levels in circulation. The transversion of (c.298G → T) changed aspartic acid to tyrosine at position 100 (p.D100Y). The mutant leptin could neither bind to nor activate the leptin receptor in vitro, nor in leptin-deficient mice in vivo. It was found in a two-year-old boy with extreme obesity with recurrent ear and pulmonary infections. Treatment with metreleptin led to "rapid change in eating behavior, a reduction in daily energy intake, and substantial weight loss."

== Sites of synthesis ==
Leptin is produced primarily in the adipocytes of white adipose tissue. It also is produced by brown adipose tissue, placenta (syncytiotrophoblasts), ovaries, skeletal muscle, stomach (the lower part of the fundic glands), mammary epithelial cells, bone marrow, gastric chief cells, and P/D1 cells.

Diagram representing where leptin is produced in the human body, where it goes, and what it causes

== Blood levels ==
Leptin circulates in blood in free form and bound to proteins.

=== Physiologic variation ===
Leptin levels vary exponentially, not linearly, with fat mass. Leptin levels in blood are higher between midnight and early morning, perhaps suppressing appetite during the night. The diurnal rhythm of blood leptin levels may be modified by meal-timing.

=== In specific conditions ===
In humans, many instances are seen where leptin dissociates from the strict role of communicating nutritional status between body and brain and no longer correlates with body fat levels:

- Leptin plays a critical role in the adaptive response to starvation.
- Leptin level is decreased after short-term fasting (24–72 hours), even when changes in fat mass are not observed.
- Serum level of leptin is reduced by sleep deprivation.
- Leptin levels are paradoxically increased in obesity.
- Leptin level is increased by emotional stress.
- Leptin level is chronically reduced by physical exercise training.
- Leptin level is decreased by increases in testosterone levels and increased by increases in estrogen levels.
- Leptin level is increased by insulin.
- Leptin release is increased by dexamethasone.
- In obese patients with obstructive sleep apnea, leptin level is increased, but decreased after the administration of continuous positive airway pressure. In non-obese individuals, however, restful sleep (i.e., 8–12 hours of unbroken sleep) can increase leptin to normal levels.

=== In mutations ===
All known leptin mutations except one are associated with low to undetectable immunoreactive leptin blood levels. The exception is a mutant leptin reported in January 2015 that is not functional, but is detected with standard immunoreactive methods. It was found in a massively obese 2 1/2-year-old boy who had high levels of circulating leptin that had no effect on leptin receptors, so he was functionally leptin-deficient.

== Role in disease ==
=== Obesity ===
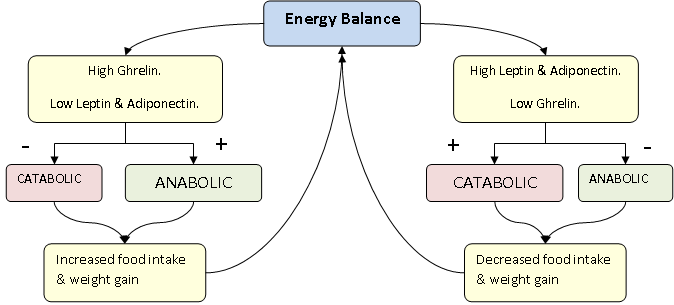
Leptin and Ghrelin on the metabolism control

Although leptin reduces appetite as a circulating signal, obese individuals generally exhibit a higher circulating concentration of leptin than normal weight individuals due to their higher percentage body fat. These people show resistance to leptin, similar to resistance of insulin in type 2 diabetes, with the elevated levels failing to control hunger and modulate their weight. A number of explanations have been proposed to explain this. An important contributor to leptin resistance is changes to leptin receptor signalling, particularly in the arcuate nucleus. However, deficiency of, or major changes to, the leptin receptor itself are not thought to be a major cause. Triglycerides crossing the blood brain barrier (BBB) can induce leptin and insulin resistance in the hypothalamus. Triglycerides can also impair leptin transport across the BBB.

Studies on leptin cerebrospinal fluid (CSF) levels provide evidence for the reduction in leptin crossing the BBB and reaching obesity-relevant targets, such as the hypothalamus, in obese people. In humans it has been observed that the ratio of leptin in the CSF compared to the blood is lower in obese people than in people of a normal weight. The reason for this may be high levels of triglycerides affecting the transport of leptin across the BBB or due to the leptin transporter becoming saturated. Although deficits in the transfer of leptin from the plasma to the CSF is seen in obese people, they are still found to have 30% more leptin in their CSF than lean individuals. These higher CSF levels fail to prevent their obesity. Since the amount and quality of leptin receptors in the hypothalamus appears to be normal in the majority of obese humans (as judged from leptin-mRNA studies), it is likely that the leptin resistance in these individuals is due to a post leptin-receptor deficit, similar to the post-insulin receptor defect seen in type 2 diabetes.

When leptin binds with the leptin receptor, it activates a number of pathways. Leptin resistance may be caused by defects in one or more parts of this process, particularly the JAK/STAT pathway. Mice with a mutation in the leptin receptor gene that prevents the activation of STAT3 are obese and exhibit hyperphagia. The PI3K pathway may also be involved in leptin resistance, as has been demonstrated in mice by artificial blocking of PI3K signalling. The PI3K pathway also is activated by the insulin receptor and is therefore an important area where leptin and insulin act together as part of energy homeostasis. The insulin-pI3K pathway can cause POMC neurons to become insensitive to leptin through hyperpolarization.

Leptin is known to interact with amylin, a hormone involved in gastric emptying and creating a feeling of fullness. When both leptin and amylin were given to obese, leptin-resistant rats, sustained weight loss was seen. Due to its apparent ability to reverse leptin resistance, amylin has been suggested as possible therapy for obesity.

It has been suggested that the main role of leptin is to act as a starvation signal when levels are low, to help maintain fat stores for survival during times of starvation, rather than a satiety signal to prevent overeating. Leptin levels signal when an animal has enough stored energy to spend it in pursuits besides acquiring food. This would mean that leptin resistance in obese people is a normal part of mammalian physiology and possibly, could confer a survival advantage. Leptin resistance (in combination with insulin resistance and weight gain) is seen in rats after they are given unlimited access to palatable, energy-dense foods. This effect is reversed when the animals are put back on a low-energy diet. This also may have an evolutionary advantage: allowing energy to be stored efficiently when food is plentiful would be advantageous in populations where food frequently may be scarce.

A fad diet, the Rosedale diet is based on ideas about how leptin might affect weight. It is based on unsound science and marketed with unevidenced claims of health benefits.

=== Role in osteoarthritis with obesity ===
==== Obesity and osteoarthritis ====
Osteoarthritis and obesity are closely linked. Obesity is one of the most important preventable factors for the development of osteoarthritis.

Originally, the relationship between osteoarthritis and obesity was considered to be exclusively biomechanically based, according to which the excess weight caused the joint to become worn down more quickly. However, today we recognise that there is also a metabolic component which explains why obesity is a risk factor for osteoarthritis, not only for weight-bearing joints (for example, the knees), but also for joints that do not bear weight (for example, the hands). Consequently, it has been shown that decreasing body fat lessens osteoarthritis to a greater extent than weight loss per se. This metabolic component related with the release of systemic factors, of a pro-inflammatory nature, by the adipose tissues, which frequently are critically associated with the development of osteoarthritis.

Thus, the deregulated production of adipokines and inflammatory mediators, hyperlipidaemia, and the increase of systemic oxidative stress are conditions frequently associated with obesity, which can favour joint degeneration. Furthermore, many regulation factors have been implicated in the development, maintenance, and function, both of adipose tissues, as well as of the cartilage and other joint tissues. Alterations in these factors can be the additional link between obesity and osteoarthritis.

==== Leptin and osteoarthritis ====
Adipocytes interact with other cells through producing and secreting a variety of signalling molecules, including the cell signalling proteins known as adipokines. Certain adipokines can be considered as hormones, as they regulate the functions of organs at a distance, and several of them have been specifically involved in the physiopathology of joint diseases. In particular, there is one, leptin, which has been the focus of attention for research in recent years.

The circulating leptin levels are positively correlated with the Body Mass Index (BMI), more specifically with fatty mass, and obese individuals have higher leptin levels in their blood circulation, compared with non-obese individuals. In obese individuals, the increased circulating leptin levels induce unwanted responses, that is, reduced food intake or losing body weight does not occur as there is a resistance to leptin (ref 9). In addition to the function of regulating energy homeostasis, leptin carries out a role in other physiological functions such as neuroendocrine communication, reproduction, angiogenesis, and bone formation. More recently, leptin has been recognised as a cytokine factor as well as with pleiotropic actions also in the immune response and inflammation. For example, leptin can be found in the synovial fluid in correlation with the body mass index, and the leptin receptors are expressed in the cartilage, where leptin mediates and modulates many inflammatory responses that can damage cartilage and other joint tissues. Leptin has thus emerged as a candidate to link obesity and osteoarthritis and serves as an apparent objective as a nutritional treatment for osteoarthritis.

As in the plasma, the leptin levels in the synovial fluid are positively correlated with BMI. The leptin of the synovial fluid is synthesised at least partially in the joint and may originate in part in the circulation. Leptin has been shown to be produced by chondrocytes, as well as by other tissues in the joints, including the synovial tissue, osteophytes, the meniscus, and bone. An infrapatellar fat pad located extrasynovially within the knee joint is also adjacent to the synovial membrane and cartilage, and has recently been highly appreciated as an important source of leptin, as well as other adipokines and mediators that contribute to the pathogenesis of osteoarthritis

The risk of developing osteoarthritis can be decreased with weight loss. This reduction of risk is related in part with the decrease of the load on the joint, but also in the decrease of fatty mass, the central adipose tissue and the low-level inflammation associated with obesity and systemic factors.

This growing evidence points to leptin as a cartilage degradation factor in the pathogenesis of osteoarthritis, and as a potential biomarker in the progression of the disease, which suggests that leptin, as well as regulation and signalling mechanisms, can be a new and promising target in the treatment of osteoarthritis, especially in obese patients.

Obese individuals are predisposed to developing osteoarthritis, not only due to the excess mechanical load, but also due to the excess expression of soluble factors, that is, leptin and pro-inflammatory cytokines, which contribute to joint inflammation and cartilage destruction. As such, obese individuals are in an altered state, due to a metabolic insufficiency, which requires specific nutritional treatment capable of normalising the leptin production and reducing the systematic low-level inflammation, in order to reduce the harmful impact of these systematic mediators on the joint health.

== Therapeutic use ==
=== Leptin ===
Leptin was approved in the United States in 2014 for use in congenital leptin deficiency and generalized lipodystrophy.

=== Analog metreleptin ===
An analog of human leptin metreleptin (trade names Myalept, Myalepta) was first approved in Japan in 2013, in the United States in February 2014, and in Europe in 2018. In the US it is indicated as a treatment for complications of leptin deficiency, and for the diabetes and hypertriglyceridemia associated with congenital or acquired generalized lipodystrophy. In Europe based on EMA, metreleptin should be used in addition to diet to treat lipodystrophy, where patients have loss of fatty tissue under the skin and build-up of fat elsewhere in the body such as in the liver and muscles. The medicine is used in adults and children above the age of 2 years with generalised lipodystrophy (Berardinelli-Seip syndrome and Lawrence syndrome); and in adults and children above the age of 12 years with partial lipodystrophy (including Barraquer-Simons syndrome), when standard treatments have failed.

The National Health Service in England will commission metreleptin treatment for all with congenital leptin deficiency regardless of age beginning on April 1, 2019.

== Research ==
Leptin is currently being evaluated as a potential target for the treatment of anorexia nervosa. It is hypothesized that the gradual loss of body fat mass, and more specifically the ensuing low leptin levels, escalate the preexisting drive for thinness into an obsessive-compulsive-like and addictive-like state. It was shown that short-term metreleptin treatment of patients with anorexia nervosa had rapid on-set of beneficial cognitive, emotional, and behavioral effects. Among other things, depression, drive for activity, repetitive thoughts of food, inner restlessness, and weight phobia decreased rapidly. Whether metreleptin (or another leptin analogue) is a suitable treatment for anorexia nervosa is currently unknown. Potential side effects are weight loss and the development of anti-metreleptin antibodies.

== History ==
Leptin was discovered by Jeffrey Friedman in 1994 after several decades of research conducted by others institutions since 1950 on obese mouse models.

=== Identification of the encoding gene ===
In 1949, a non-obese mouse colony being studied at the Jackson Laboratory produced a strain of obese offspring, suggesting that a mutation had occurred in a hormone regulating hunger and energy expenditure. Mice homozygous for the so-called ob mutation (ob/ob) ate voraciously and were massively obese. In the 1960s, a second mutation causing obesity and a similar phenotype was identified by Douglas Coleman, also at the Jackson Laboratory, and was named diabetes (db), as both ob/ob and db/db were obese. In 1990 Rudolph Leibel and Jeffrey M. Friedman reported mapping of the db gene.

Consistent with Coleman's and Leibel's hypothesis, several subsequent studies from Leibel's and Friedman's labs and other groups confirmed that the ob gene encoded a novel hormone that circulated in blood and that could suppress food intake and body weight in ob and wild type mice, but not in db mice.

In 1994, Friedman's laboratory reported the identification of the gene. In 1995, Jose F. Caro's laboratory provided evidence that the mutations in the mouse ob gene did not occur in humans. Furthermore, since ob gene expression was increased, not decreased, in human obesity, it suggested resistance to leptin to be a possibility. At the suggestion of Roger Guillemin, Friedman named this new hormone "leptin" from the Greek lepto meaning thin. Leptin was the first fat cell-derived hormone (adipokine) to be discovered.

Subsequent studies in 1995 confirmed that the db gene encodes the leptin receptor, and that it is expressed in the hypothalamus, a region of the brain known to regulate the sensation of hunger and body weight.

=== Recognition of scientific advances ===
Coleman and Friedman have been awarded numerous prizes acknowledging their roles in discovery of leptin, including the Gairdner Foundation International Award (2005), the Shaw Prize (2009), the Lasker Award, the BBVA Foundation Frontiers of Knowledge Award and the King Faisal International Prize, Leibel has not received the same level of recognition from the discovery because he was omitted as a co-author of a scientific paper published by Friedman that reported the discovery of the gene. The various theories surrounding Friedman's omission of Leibel and others as co-authors of this paper have been presented in a number of publications, including Ellen Ruppel Shell's 2002 book The Hungry Gene.

The discovery of leptin also is documented in a series of books including Fat: Fighting the Obesity Epidemic by Robert Pool, The Hungry Gene by Ellen Ruppel Shell, and Rethinking Thin: The New Science of Weight Loss and the Myths and Realities of Dieting by Gina Kolata. Fat: Fighting the Obesity Epidemic and Rethinking Thin: The New Science of Weight Loss and the Myths and Realities of Dieting review the work in the Friedman laboratory that led to the cloning of the ob gene, while The Hungry Gene draws attention to the contributions of Leibel.

== See also ==
- Ghrelin
- NAPEs
- Raptin
- Teleost leptins
