= Pathophysiology of obesity =

Physiological processes in obese people

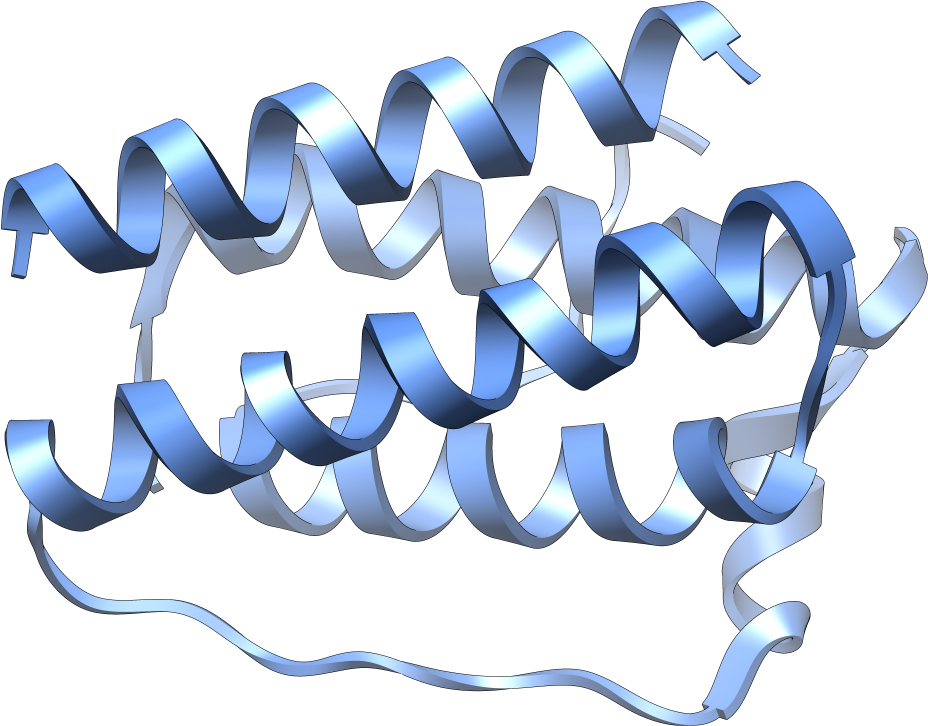
A graphic depiction of a leptin molecule

Pathophysiology of obesity is the study of disordered physiological processes that cause, result from, or are otherwise associated with obesity. A number of possible pathophysiological mechanisms have been identified which may contribute in the development and maintenance of obesity. Obesity results from a complex interplay of genetic, hormonal, neural, and environmental factors that dysregulate energy balance.

== Research ==
This field of research had been almost unapproached until the leptin gene was discovered in 1994 by J. M. Friedman's laboratory. These investigators postulated that leptin was a satiety factor. In the ob/ob mouse, mutations in the leptin gene resulted in the obese phenotype opening the possibility of leptin therapy for human obesity. However, soon thereafter J. F. Caro's laboratory could not detect any mutations in the leptin gene in humans with obesity. On the contrary, leptin expression was increased, proposing the possibility of leptin-resistance in human obesity. Since this discovery, many other hormonal mechanisms have been elucidated that participate in the regulation of appetite and food intake, storage patterns of adipose tissue, and development of insulin resistance. Since leptin's discovery, ghrelin, insulin, orexin, PYY 3-36, cholecystokinin, adiponectin, GLP-1, as well as many other mediators have been studied. In particular, obesity is associated with impaired L-cell secretion of GLP-1. The adipokines are mediators produced by adipose tissue; their action is thought to modify many obesity-related diseases. Recent research has also implicated western-diet-induced alterations to the duodenal mucosa as an early step in the pathophysiology of obesity, via altered neurohormonal signaling.

== Appetite ==
Leptin and ghrelin are considered to be complementary in their influence on appetite, with ghrelin produced by the stomach modulating short-term appetitive control (i.e. to eat when the stomach is empty and to stop when the stomach is stretched). Leptin is produced by adipose tissue to signal fat storage reserves in the body, and mediates long-term appetitive controls (i.e. to eat more when fat storages are low and less when fat storages are high). Although administration of leptin may be effective in a small subset of obese individuals who are leptin-deficient, most obese individuals are thought to be leptin resistant and have been found to have high levels of leptin. This resistance is thought to explain in part why administration of leptin has not been shown to be effective in suppressing appetite in most obese people.

While leptin and ghrelin are produced peripherally, they control appetite through their actions on the central nervous system. In particular, they and other appetite-related hormones act on the hypothalamus, a region of the brain central to the regulation of food intake and energy expenditure. There are several circuits within the hypothalamus that contribute to its role in integrating appetite, the melanocortin pathway being the most well understood. The circuit begins with an area of the hypothalamus, the arcuate nucleus, that has outputs to the lateral hypothalamus (LH) and ventromedial hypothalamus (VMH), the brain's feeding and satiety centers, respectively.

Recent studies have identified the duodenal mucosa as an important site for nutrient sensing, influencing hormonal and neuronal pathways that regulate appetite and metabolism. The duodenum contains enteroendocrine cells that detect dietary macronutrients and release hormones such as cholecystokinin (CCK), glucagon-like peptide-1 (GLP-1), glucose-dependent insulinotropic polypeptide (GIP), and peptide YY (PYY), which signal satiety and help regulate energy intake. In obesity, morphological changes in the duodenal mucosa, including mucosal hyperplasia and increased enteroendocrine cell density, have been observed, potentially leading to altered hormone secretion and impaired nutrient sensing. These alterations in the secretion and action of duodenal hormones, including potential resistance to their effects, may reduce satiety perception, leading to increased food intake. Impaired duodenal vagal afferent signaling may also reduce satiety perception, leading to increased food intake.

== Arcuate nucleus ==
The arcuate nucleus contains two distinct groups of neurons. The first group coexpresses neuropeptide Y (NPY) and agouti-related peptide (AgRP) and has stimulatory inputs to the LH and inhibitory inputs to the VMH. The second group coexpresses pro-opiomelanocortin (POMC) and cocaine- and amphetamine-regulated transcript (CART) and has stimulatory inputs to the VMH and inhibitory inputs to the LH. Consequently, NPY/AgRP neurons stimulate feeding and inhibit satiety, while POMC/CART neurons stimulate satiety and inhibit feeding. Both groups of arcuate nucleus neurons are regulated in part by leptin. Leptin inhibits the NPY/AgRP group while stimulating the POMC/CART group. Thus a deficiency in leptin signaling, either via leptin deficiency or leptin resistance, leads to overfeeding and may account for some genetic and acquired forms of obesity.

In addition to hypothalamic pathways, gut-brain signaling originating from the duodenum influences feeding behavior. The duodenum communicates with the brain via the vagus nerve, transmitting nutrient-sensing signals that modulate hypothalamic activity. In obesity, resistance to duodenal-derived satiety hormones like CCK and GLP-1 has been linked to disrupted vagal signaling, impairing the brain's ability to regulate food intake effectively. This suggests that obesity-related changes in peripheral nutrient sensing mechanisms contribute to the dysregulation of central appetite control.

== Effects on the immune system ==
Obesity has been associated with an inflammatory state, which is chronic and low-grade inflammation, known as meta-inflammation. Meta-inflammation is subclinical meaning that while there is an increase in circulating pro-inflammatory factors, no clinical signs of inflammation, heat, pain, and redness, are seen with meta-inflammation. Based on the immune system cells involved, both innate and adaptive immunity are involved in meta-inflammation.

There are different types of obesity depending on where fat cells are stored. Abdominal obesity, excess fat cell accumulation in adipose tissue of the abdomen, is associated more strongly with meta-inflammation.

Evolutionarily, adipose tissue has been shown to function as an immune organ. The immune cells located in adipose tissue are important for maintaining metabolic homeostasis. With obesity, the immune cells important for maintaining metabolic homeostasis are suppressed because immune cell function and immune cell amount are affected by excess fat accumulation in adipose tissue. Excess fat accumulation can lead to insulin resistance, and insulin resistance has been linked to meta-inflammation. With insulin resistance, there is an increase in macrophages, mast cells, neutrophils, T lymphocytes, and B lymphocytes, and a decrease in eosinophils and some T lymphocytes.

Obesity has also been shown to induce hypoxic conditions in adipose cells. Hypoxic conditions result from fat cells expanding, and this decreases vascularization to surrounding fat cells. Decreased vascularization results in decreased amounts of oxygen in adipose tissue so adipose cells have to switch to anaerobic metabolism for energy production. Anaerobic metabolism stimulates inflammation caused by macrophages. There are two types of macrophages, classically activated M1 macrophages that increase inflammation and alternatively activated M2 macrophages that decrease inflammation. In animal studies, obesity has been shown to cause a shift from M2 to M1 macrophages in adipose tissue, causing an increase in inflammation.

Excessive fat tissue has a direct effect on the productivity of the immune system by slowing it down or interrupting the activity of the cells. It can alter the number of leukocytes, neutrophils, monocytes, and lymphocytes an individual has, while also lowering T and B cell mitogen-induced production. The growth of fat tissue is followed by metabolic stress and inflammation in the adipose tissue. The dysregulation causes apoptosis in adipose tissue cells, then activating an influx of inflammatory leukocytes, ultimately resulting in chronic inflammation. There begin to be too many pro-inflammatory mediators, like cytokines and macrophages, that start blocking anti-inflammatory cytokines, weakening the ability to maintain stable levels of fat in the blood (high cholesterol) and desensitizing the body’s reaction to insulin. Extracellular vesicles are diminished in the adipose tissue, and they help assist in cell communication, growth, and other functions. Additionally, obesity can irregulate the hormone levels in a person’s body that are initially supported through nutrition. These hormones control metabolic functions like appetite, energy usage, and adipose tissue distribution in the body. Leptin, an appetite and energy-controlling hormone, is increased in obese individuals, potentially causing infections within the cells because of the hormone's ability to regulate immune cells, like CD4+T cells.

== Specific foods and diets impacting immunity ==
Maintaining a healthy diet and consuming substantial nutrition will help ensure that a person has a stronger immune system. Malnutrition can impact inflammatory responses in the innate immune system. Consuming certain vitamins like vitamin A can help promote cell division and growth, while a deficiency could result in irregular innate and adaptive immune cell functions. Vitamins B1, B2, B3, and B12, have been linked to helping general functions within cells. This includes foods like fruits, nuts, eggs, meats, fish, and many other foods. A dangerous diet includes processed foods, “fast food”, and sugary beverages, all of which are characterized as having low nutritional value. This diet can be described as a “western diet” which is defined by containing high levels of sugar, salt, white flour, processed meat, and food additives. Thus, allowing for spikes in glucose and insulin, while also not giving enough nutrients to be absorbed in the adipose tissue.
