= Heart Support of America =

Heart Support of America is an American non-profit organization, a 501(c)(3) charity, based in Knoxville, Tennessee, also known as "Veteran's Heart Relief". The mission of the organization is to provide financial assistance directly to individuals who have cardiac problems and grants to social organizations involved in assisting patients with cardiac problems. Patients or their families can apply for aid via an online application form accessible from the organization's homepage.

Jim Halliburton founded the organization sometime after 1991 when he had a near-death experience following a massive heart attack. A former patient of Dr. Ron Rosedale, Mr. Halliburton publishes and distributes a work entitled Heart Support of America which advocates Dr. Rosedale's metabolic approach to the treatment of heart disease.

Heart Support of America has been criticized for giving an overly low percentage of their funds to the causes that they represent. It was listed as one of "America's worst charities" in a 2013 Tampa Bay Times/CNN/Center for Investigative Reporting report because of its fundraising and spending practices. Charitable organizations differ in and are often compared on the basis of their methods of fundraising and the percentage of funds going toward primary mission aims versus administrative overhead. Information available from 2004 indicates that Heart Support of America distributes less than 40% of funds collected to the patients and social organizations that figure in its mission statement; the remaining 60% of funds raised were expended on a mixture of expenses incurred in raising funds and overall administrative expenses. Fundraising is conducted by the organization through a combination of direct solicitation and indirectly through professional solicitors.
