= Teleost leptins =

Leptin
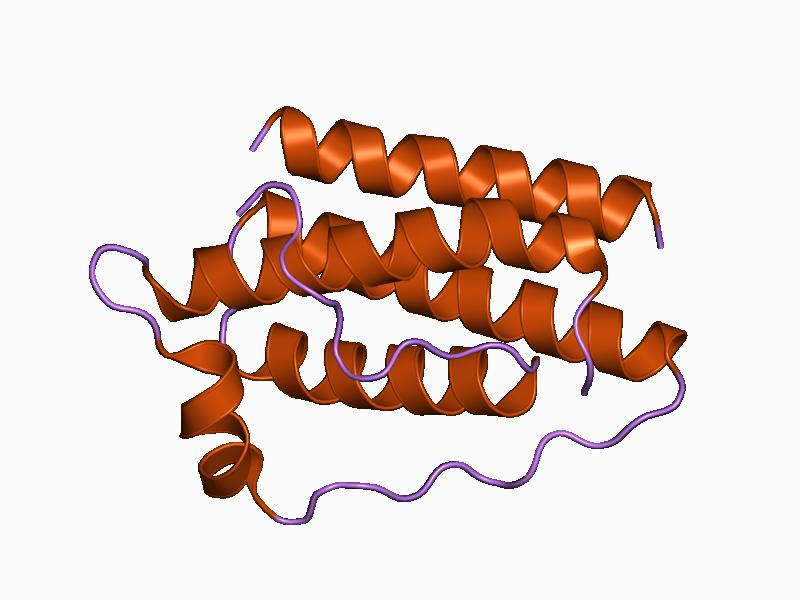
- Structure of the obese protein leptin-E100.

Identifiers
- Symbol: Leptin
- Pfam: PF02024
- Pfam clan: CL0053
- InterPro: IPR000065
- SCOP2: 1ax8 / SCOPe / SUPFAM
Available protein structures:
- PDB: 1ax8 IPR000065 PF02024 (ECOD; PDBsum)
- AlphaFold: IPR000065; PF02024

Teleost leptins are a family of peptide hormones found in fish (teleostei) that are orthologs of the mammalian hormone leptin. The teleost and mammalian leptins appear to have similar functions, namely, regulation of energy intake and expenditure.

The leptin (LEP) hormone was long thought to be specific to mammals, but in recent years the gene (lep) has been found in amphibia such as the tiger salamander (Ambystoma tigrinum), and the African clawed frog (Xenopus laevi). The discovery of lep in puffer fish (Takifugu rubripes) demonstrates the ancient ancestry of this hormone.

== Examples ==
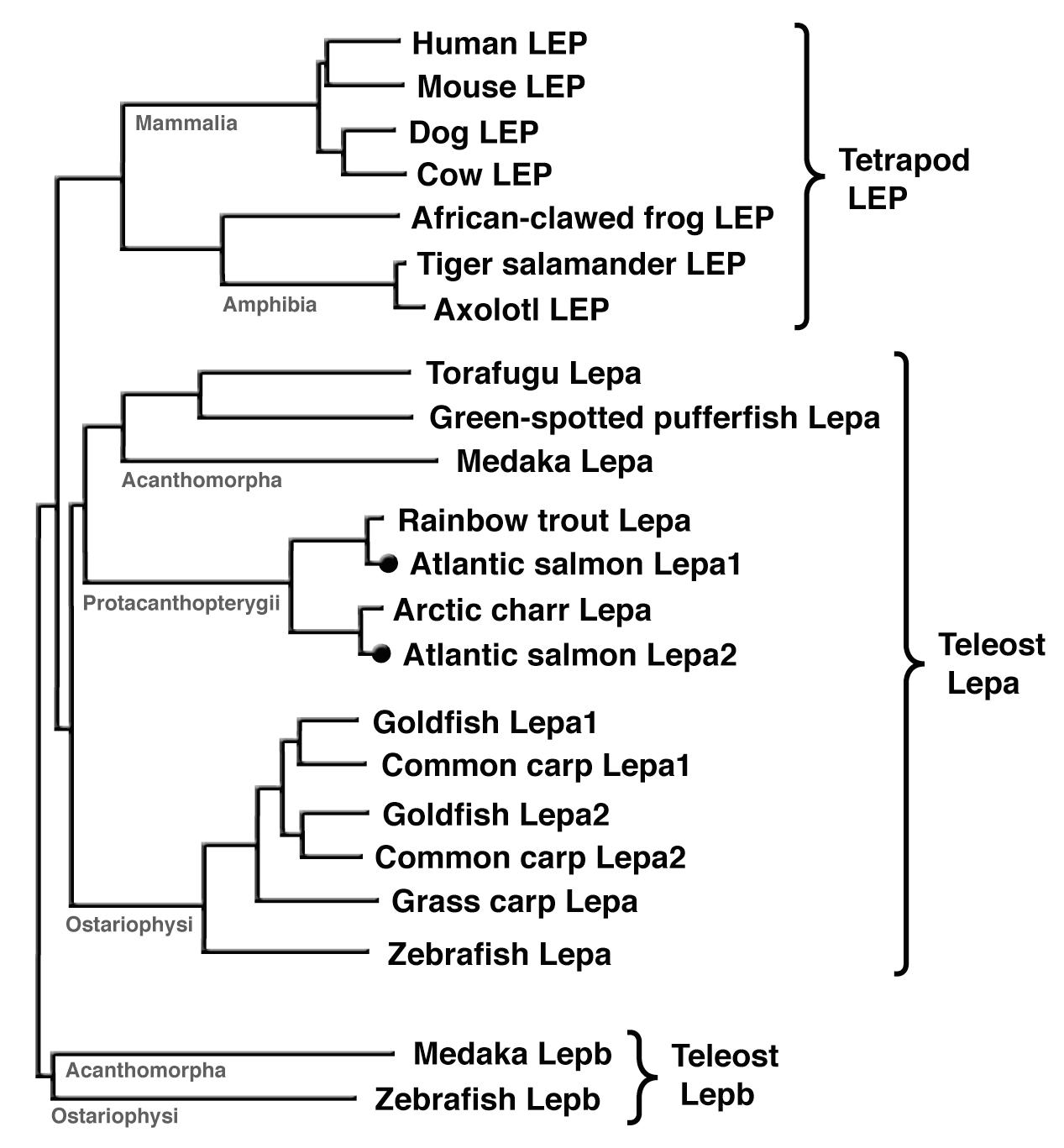
Figure 1. Phylogenetic tree of vertebrate leptins

There are two closely related lep paralogues in Atlantic salmon (Salmo salar). A single lep gene has been documented for green-spotted pufferfish (Tetraodon nigroviridis), rainbow trout (Oncorhynchus mykiss), Arctic charr (Salvelinus alpinus), silver carp (Hypophthalmichthys molitrix), and grass carp (Ctenopharyngodon idellus). In other species there are reports of two closely related lep paralogues, including common carp (Cyprinus carpio) and Atlantic salmon. More distantly related lep genes have been found in medaka (Oryzias latipes) and zebrafish (Danio rerio). At least 2 leptin genes (lepa and lepb) exist in the crown-clade (Fig. 1). Early findings have shown that lepa and lepb share low interspecies aa identity, and are argued to have arisen through whole genome duplication, which occurred early in the teleost lineage. The duplicity of genes has been described for Atlantic salmon, Japanese medaka, common carp and zebrafish. Both lep paralogues cluster with lepa, and therefore suggest that at least one or more form (lepb) may exist in this species, since it is tetraploid. However, previous attempts using genomic synteny have only found the putative genomic duplicates in medaka and zebrafish paralogue. Currently it remains unclear, whether lepb exists in other teleosts due to the degenerative nature of this paralogue.

== Comparison with mammalian leptin ==
The large differences among endothermic (warm-blooded) mammalian and ectothermic (cold-blooded) teleost leptins raised the question of whether the energy homeostatic functions of the teleost leptins are conserved. Initial phylogenetic analysis has revealed that amino acid conservation with other vertebrate Lep orthologues is low, with only 13.2% sequence identity between torafugu and human LEP. Subsequent investigations have confirmed the low amino acid identity of teleost leps compared to mammalian LEP.

== Structure ==
The three-dimensional homology modeling predicts strong conservation of the tertiary structure between Atlantic salmon and other teleost Leps compared to their mammalian orthologues (Fig. 2).

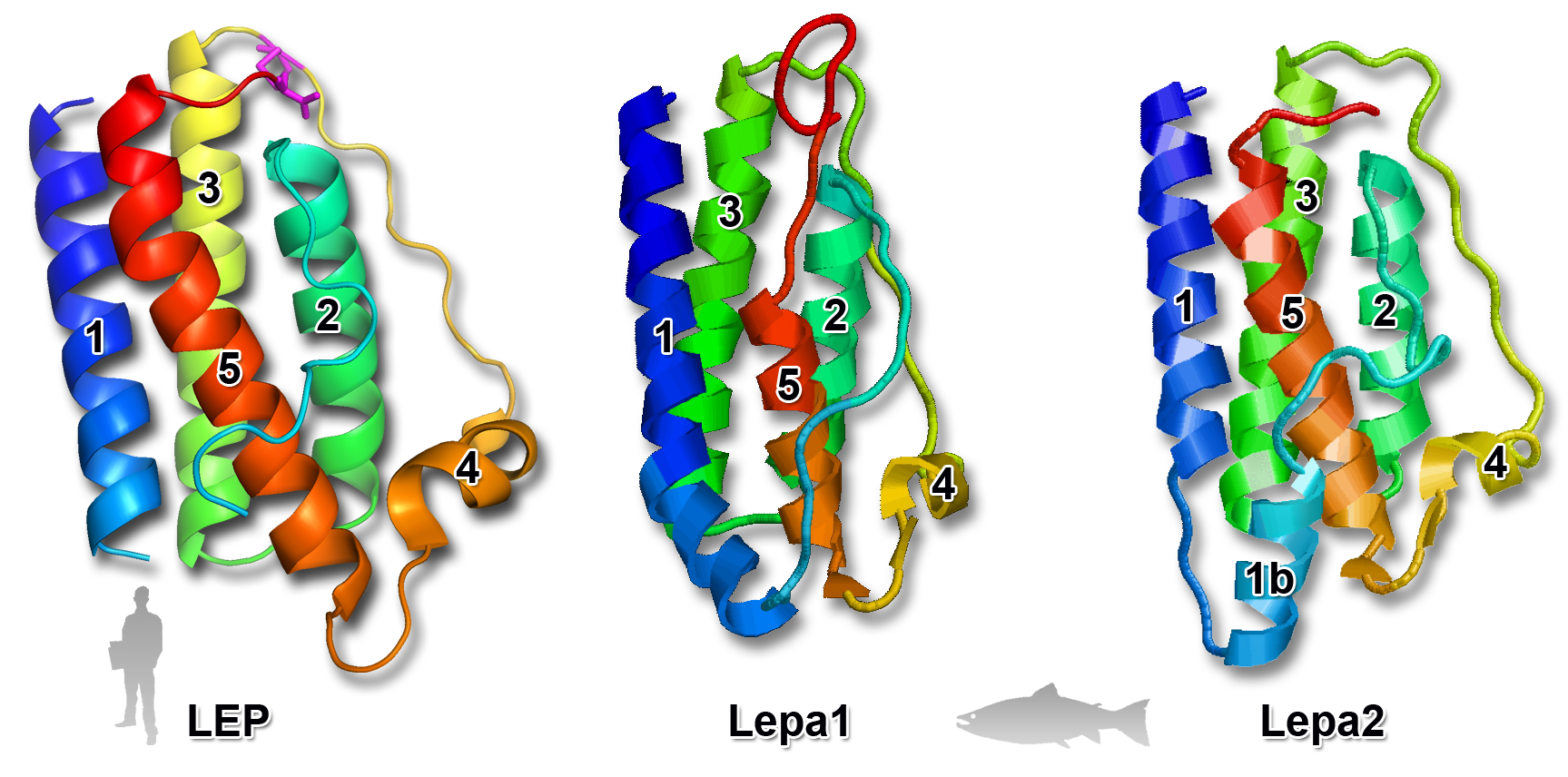
Figure 2. Homology models (created using the SwissProt ProModII homology modeling server) of Atlantic salmon leptins (lepa1, lepa2) compared to the crystallographic structure (PDB: 1AX8) of human leptin (LEP). The human leptin structure shows the four anti-parallel α-helices (1, 2, 4, 5) with corresponding domains in the Atlantic salmon proteins. The C-terminal cysteine is depicted as ball and stick diagram.

Both lepa1 and lepa2 have two characteristic cysteine residues which predict the formation of a disulfide bond in Lep, which is a pre-equisite for this 3D configuration and bioactivity of human LEP. The models suggest that the bonding of lepa2 might be different from lepa1. There are several differences between the 3D structures of lepa1 and lepa2; e.g. α-helix 5 is considerable shorter in lepa1 than lepa2. Furthermore, α-helix 1 for lepa2 appears to be split by a short-disordered region, and may therefore have a poorer affinity. However, considering that it is a predicted model based upon the structure mask of human LEP, the significance of these putative conformational adjustments remains to be tested.

The importance of the conserved tertiary structure of Lep is most likely explained by requirements for specific LepR-binding affinity and is constrained by the structure of the receptor-binding pocket. This might also explain some of the results from studies on teleost using heterologous mammalian Lep. E.g. treatment with the mammalian hormone caused an anorexic effect in goldfish (Carassius auratus) and green sunfish (Lepomis cyanellus), but not in Coho salmon (Oncorhynchus kisutch), channel catfish (Ictalurus punctatus) and green sunfish. These contradicting results have been explained by the relatively large differences in amino acid sequences observed between mammals and fish.

Rønnestad and colleagues recently detected five isoforms of the leptin receptor (lepr) that have differences in 3'-end of the mRNA sequence. Of these, only the longest form conserved all functionally important domains (such as three fibronectin type III domains, the Ig C2-like domain, a pair of WSXWS motifs, two JAK2-binding motif boxes, and a STAT-binding domain), while the other four forms have only the intra-cellular region. The long form of mammalian LepR has a function for full signal transduction through the JAK/STAT pathways, whereas the shorter forms exhibit partial or no signaling capabilities. The biological importance of long form LepR via the JAK/STAT pathway in maintaining body weight and energy homeostasis has been demonstrated. Previous studies in teleosts have only identified a single lepr. Rønnestad et al., is the first to report that plural LepR transcripts in any ectotherm species. When looking at the available motif for lepr, the model suggests that it would bind easily to lepa1 and not lepa2 (Fig. 2). Furthermore, the relatively ubiquitous expression of lepr in salmon tissues supports diverse roles of lep in teleosts.

== Tissue distribution ==
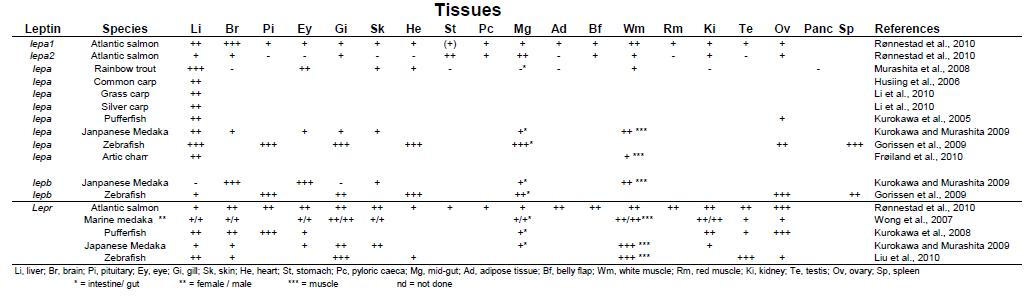
Fig. 3. Summary of the tissue distribution of the distantly related lep genes and more closely related lep paralogues in teleost.

The study on torafugu indicated that lep is mainly expressed in the liver in contrasts to the adipose secretion in mammals. However recent studies have shown that lep is expressed in several peripheral tissues, including intestine, kidney, ovary, muscle and adipose tissue. The multiplicity of lep genes and their low conservation in Teleostei. suggest that their physiological roles may be more divergent than reported for mammals.

The tissue expression pattern for the Atlantic salmon lep paralogues differs substantially (Fig.3) and hence indicates a possible difference in function. With the exception of the results presented here, and those for zebrafish and Japanese medaka. Few studies have investigated the broad tissue distribution of lep in teleost fishes. The more distantly related lep genes (lepa and lepb) showed distinct differences in tissue distribution, as shown in e.g. medaka, where lepa is being expressed in liver and muscle, while lepb is more highly expressed in the brain and eye. However, these differences are also observed for more closely related lep paralogues, such as lepa1 in Atlantic salmon, being more highly expressed in brain, liver and white muscle, while lepa2 is mainly expressed in the stomach and midgut. (Fig. 3).

== Effects of nutritional status ==
The observations that long-term feed restriction does not significantly affect lep expression in Atlantic salmon has also been noted in other teleosts. However it is likely that prolonged feed restriction can influence several endocrine parameters to adapt to the nutritional condition. For example, in common carp, a rapid response in ob gene expression in hepatic tissue of common carp shortly after feeding, but no changes in expression in response to different long-term feeding regime was observed. These authors suggested that this effect could be explained by the fact that starved fish do not lose weight as rapidly as mammals, a consequence of being ectothermic and possessing a much lower standard metabolic rate, and therefore can withstand longer periods of starvation. A similar study on grass carp showed that chronic injection of species-specific Lep did not affect long-term food intake and body weight, while acute injection decreased food intake. Conversely, Murashita et al., (unpublished results) observed increased proopiomelanocortin a1(pomca1) levels following chronic injection of Lep in Atlantic salmon, which suggests that chronic exposure to elevated Lep levels can decrease food intake through the Pomc pathway in this species. Recent studies in Atlantic salmon did not observe any difference of feed restriction in circulating plasma levels, which contrasts recent results in rainbow trout and suggest that the relation between circulating lep levels and energy status differs from that in mammals. However, salmon RIA appears to allow interspecies assessment of plasma lep levels. This only confirms that more comprehensive studies are needed for conclusive data interpretation. Studies on rainbow trout also implicated Lep as an anorectic hormone as in mammals. Injection of rainbow trout with recombinant trout leptin (rt-leptin) resulted in a significantly reduced appetite over two days that coincided with a decrease in hypothalamic mRNA expression of neuropeptide Y (npy) and increase of pomc mRNAs, respectively. Whether these observations are due to species-specific differences in long-term leptin regulation of appetite or growth is not known, however, consensus data indicate that the effects of Lep on appetite regulation may be short-term in teleosts.

== Short-term feed restriction ==
Recent studies on short-term effects of a meal or the absence of a meal has revealed that lepa1 expression specifically peaks in the peripheral tissues after 6 – 9 hr in the unfed fish. This suggests that the transcript specific response could be associated with the absence of food. Conversely, since the unfed fish had not received food for 33 hr (24 + 9 hr), the peaks could represent an unrelated effect. Each lepa1 peak occurred during a phase of falling plasma Lep, and since this occurred in both fed and unfed fish, the temporal upregulation of lepa1 does not in fact appear to be specifically related to the absence of food.

The earliest peak of lepa1 occurred in the white muscle, which represents an important lipid reservoir in Atlantic salmon. Unlike pufferfish, which utilizes the liver as a major lipid repository, Atlantic salmon shows that despite a high visceral lipid content, hepatocytes contain few lipid droplets compared to other fish species, yet are an important site for leptin expression. Moen and colleagues reported that both lepa1 and lepa2 peaked at 9 hr in the liver of unfed fish. By contrast, however, studies in common carp demonstrated a peak in leptin-I(lepa1) and leptin–II (lepa2) in liver at 3 and 6 hr post feeding respectively. The earlier expression response of leptins in common carp likely reflects the higher temperature under which the experiments were conducted, but contrasts the findings of upregulation of lepa1 due to the absence of food. Similarly, in mice, a postprandial increase in hepatic leptin expression has also been reported. However, in grass carp, intraperitoneal injection of recombinant leptin only alters the appetite on the first day, and does not influence food intake during the ensuing 12 days. At present, the data for Atlantic salmon are therefore quite different and suggest that leptin expression in this species may have a complex lipostatic function.
