= The Hungry Gene =

Ellen Ruppel's book

- Author: Ellen Ruppel Shell
- Language: English
- Publication date: 2002

The Hungry Gene is a 2002 book by Ellen Ruppel Shell in which she tackles the issue of obesity. It is a non-fiction journalistic book. The author devotes multiple chapters of her book to the events that led to the co-discovery of the Leptin gene in 1994. Based on interviews with the parties involved, she reports that Leptin was co-discovered at Rockefeller University by Rudolph Leibel, Jeffrey Friedman, and members of their laboratories, and explains why Leibel and others were excluded by Friedman in the scientific paper that announced the discovery.
