= P/D1 cell =

P/D1 cells are cells lining the fundus of the human stomach that produce ghrelin. Removal of these cells in gastric bypass surgery has a profound impact on later appetite regulation. These cells have also been shown to produce ghrelin's antagonistic hormone leptin. PD/1 cells are equivalent to A-like cells in rats and X-type cells in dogs. These endocrine cells can be microscopically distinguished from other gastric endocrine cells through their round, compact, electron-dense secretory granules.
