= Ellen Ruppel Shell =

American journalist

Ellen Ruppel Shell (born 1952) is a correspondent for The Atlantic Monthly, and professor of science journalism.

== Biography ==
Shell was born in Auburn, New York, United States. In 1974, Shell received a B.A. degree from the University of Rochester. Her work tends to focus on the intersection of science and society with a special emphasis on medical policy, and she also writes on the politics of science, science and the media, and environmental policy.

== Works ==
Shell is the author of four books:

- A Child's Place: a year in the life of a day care center (Little, Brown, 1992)
- The Hungry Gene: the science of fat and the future of thin (New York : Atlantic Monthly Press, 2002)
- Cheap: The High Cost of Discount Culture (New York : Penguin Books, 2009)
- The Job: Work and Its Future in a Time of Radical Change (New York : Crown Publishing Group, 2018)
- Slippery Beast - A True Crime and Natural History, with Eels (New York : Abrams Press, 2024)
