= Rosedale diet =

Low-carbohydrate fad diet

The Rosedale diet is a low-carbohydrate fad diet based on the ideas of Ron Rosedale about how leptin affects the human body. The diet is marketed with questionable claims about how it can treat a large number of human health conditions.

The Rosedale diet is not based on sound science, and there is no evidence it is safe or effective.

== Description ==
The Rosedale diet was devised by physician Ron Rosedale.

The diet falls into two parts, both of which have lists of restricted and permitted foods. A number of health supplements are recommended, as are 16 unconventional annual health checks. Generally, the diet severely restricts carbohydrate intake.

== Reception ==
Harriet Hall has written that the book describing the diet is a "puerile effort" in comparison to Gary Taube's book Good Calories, Bad Calories which at least attempted to have a scientific basis.

The diet has been recommended by Joseph Mercola. Hall writes that "neither Mercola nor Rosedale can be recommended to anyone who is interested in science-based medicine".

== See also ==
- Atkins diet
- Low-carbohydrate diet
