= Jose F. Caro =

American physician

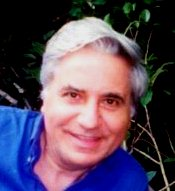
Jose F. Caro

José F. Caro (born Granada, Spain, 1948) is an American physician, scientist, and educator most notable for his research in obesity and diabetes. The Institute for Scientific Information listed him the third most cited investigator in the world in the field of obesity research during the 1991-2000 period for his work on Leptin. Caro is an artist and a signature member of the Pastel Society of America.

== Education ==
Caro received his M.D. degree in 1973 from the University of the Republic, Uruguay and Complutense University of Madrid, Spain. He completed his residency training in Internal Medicine at Jefferson Medical College of Thomas Jefferson University in 1977, becoming certified in internal medicine by the American Board of Internal Medicine. Caro completed his fellowship training in Endocrinology and Metabolism in 1981 at the Strong Memorial Hospital, University of Rochester School of Medicine and Dentistry, becoming certified in Endocrinology and Metabolism by the American Board of Internal Medicine. These formative years were funded by training grants from the American Diabetes Association and the Juvenile Diabetes Research Foundation, which also sustained his involvement in diabetes research. His early research output paved the way for him to become an independent investigator soon thereafter by receiving in 1981 the Wayne Newton Research Award from the American Diabetes Association and in 1982 the New Investigator Research Award from the National Institutes of Health.

== Medical career ==
=== East Carolina University ===
Caro was the founding Director of the Division of Endocrinology and Metabolism of The Brody School of Medicine at East Carolina University (ECU) (1982-1991). He established the ECU Diabetes Center, funded by the ECU Diabetes Program Project Grant (P01-DK 36296) from the National Institutes of Health, a multidisciplinary collaborative endeavor by scientists with specialties in medicine, biochemistry, and surgery. Among their contribution to the understanding of Insulin resistance in Type 2 Diabetes stands out the discovery of alterations in the insulin receptor kinase in the human liver. Also, in collaboration with Walter Pories, that gastric bypass surgery induced a long lasting remission of the disease in about 80% of obese people with diabetes. Moreover, in people with pre-diabetes the gastric bypass surgery prevents the development of diabetes by about 40 fold. At the time of such work the gastric bypass surgery was an experimental procedure, which is now well accepted in standard clinical practice. For the sum of this work Caro was elected a member of The American Society for Clinical Investigation (Young Turk).

=== Thomas Jefferson University ===
In 1991 Caro was recruited by his US alma mater, Jefferson Medical College of Thomas Jefferson University, to become the Magee Professor of Medicine and the 16th Chairman of the Department. During his 5-year tenure the Department´s National Institute of Health research funding nearly tripled, the residency program in medicine became the largest in Pennsylvania, and the outpatient program doubled. During this time, Caro´s research laboratory made other important breakthroughs. Caro’s group was the first to publish the complete cDNA of human leptin gene (or Ob gene), and also described the first radioimmunoassay to measure leptin in blood.

Subsequently, he was elected to the Association of American Physicians (Old Turk), and appointed by the Secretary of Health and Human Services to the Advisory Council of the National Institutes of Health (2000-2004). His research on leptin published in the Journal of Clinical Investigation in 1995 was the first to explore leptin following the discovery of the hormone by Friedman’s laboratory in 1994. Caro’s laboratory demonstrated that human obesity is not characterized by leptin deficiency but by leptin resistance and helped usher in "leptinomania" in the study of obesity. At Jefferson, Caro organized a multidisciplinary team funded by NIH to study diabetes prevention. With this effort Caro became one of the 25 principal investigators of the diabetes prevention program, a landmark -nationwide clinical trial- to show that lifestyle changes or metformin can effectively prevent type 2 diabetes.

=== Eli Lilly & Comp. ===
In 1996 Caro was named Vice President of Endocrine Research and Clinical Investigation and global diabetes care at Eli Lilly & comp. Early on his arrival, Caro developed a network of collaborations with industry and academia, and became the industry´s representative to the congressionally mandated diabetes research working group "Conquering Diabetes, a Strategic Plan for the 21st Century". During Caro´s tenure the endocrine portfolio of Lilly products grew from insulin and Humatrope to include Byetta, Actos, Evista and Forteo. At the time Caro left Eli Lilly in 2008, the company had nine new compounds in phase 1 clinical development, six in phase 2; and three in phase 3, one of which (Trulicity) became a product in 2016.

After a decade of work in drug discovery Caro was recruited again by the Brody School of Medicine at ECU, where he became the Associate Dean for Clinical Investigation and the founding Director of the ECU Metabolic Institute. During his medical career Caro published more than 200 research papers, book chapters and editorials, registered 8 patents (CA2282341A1, WO1998036767A1, CA2281888, US5965521, WO1998036763, WO2000024418, EP1128840, WO2000024418) and delivered many honorary lectures such as the Banting and Best Lecture at the University of Toronto, Canada; the A.M. Cohen Memorial Lecture in Jerusalem, Israel; the Alexander Marble Lecture at Harvard Medical School; the Mithoffer Memorial Lecture at the Medical University of South Carolina; the Bernardo A. Houssay Lecture in San Jose, Costa Rica; and the Karl Paschis and Leslie Nicholas lectures in Philadelphia, among others.

For the sum of his work Caro was elected Miembro Honorario of the Real Academia de Medicina of Granada, Spain. Also honorary co-director (together with C. Ronald Kahn), and ceremony lecturer of the Peking University Diabetes Center.

Caro left Medicine in 2008 as the Distinguished Professor of Medicine Emeritus to start a new career in art.

== Art career ==
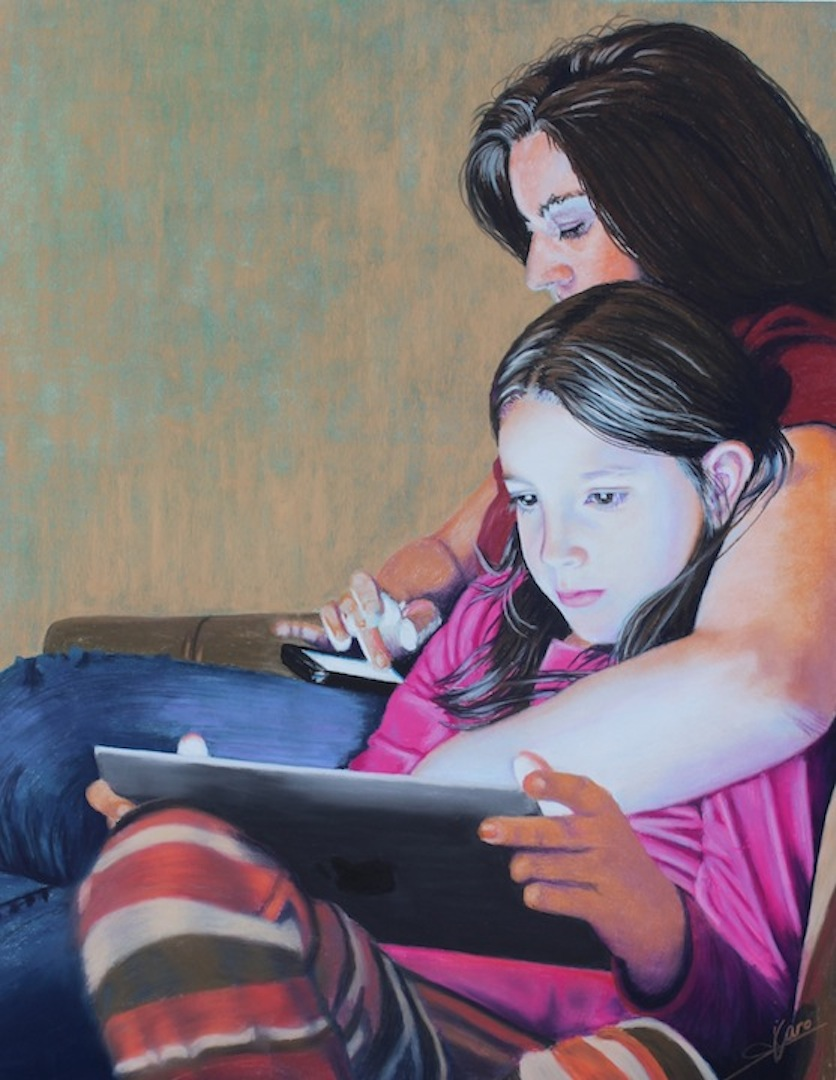
Maternity, pastel by Jose F. Caro

Caro went back to school to study fine arts at the Indianapolis Art Center, and the Carteret Community College. Along with this non-degree formal education, for several years Caro has been painting with colleagues while attending art classes and workshops. After submission of his portfolio he was jury-elected a Member of the Pastel Society of America in 2013, the Degas Pastel Society, and the Indiana Artists. Since then Caro’s pastel paintings have been juried at various US and international exhibits. One notable piece of his pastel paintings is I am not a little girl anymore presented at the 23rd International Association of Pastel Societies Juried Exhibition, and awarded the 3rd place in the Artist’s Magazine January 2014 contest. The painting is said to "capture the sense of isolation and alienation that so often accompany a girl’s journey into adolescence.

Another significant piece of Caro´s is the pastel Maternity, juried at the 10th Annual Northeast National Pastel Exhibition and receiving the "Outstanding Portrait Award". According to jurors this painting represents "a metaphor of modern family, the interplay between the oldest of bonds between a mother and daughter and the new technology, the tension between physical connection and mental distance; each of the two is in her own universe on her owm device yet both warmly bonded together".

Also, Maternity was one of the eight paintings selected at the Indy´s Indiana Bicentennial Exhibition. Another piece (The Hug) received the Art-Inspired Story Award at the Peninsula Art league 2015 Juried Art Show. The poet Judith Cullen wrote a story inspired in The Hug. Another pastel painting by Caro (Choices) earned an Award of Merit from the Degas Pastel Society. Caro´s inspiration for his realistic and psychological paintings are mainly his family and the sea.

== Gallery ==
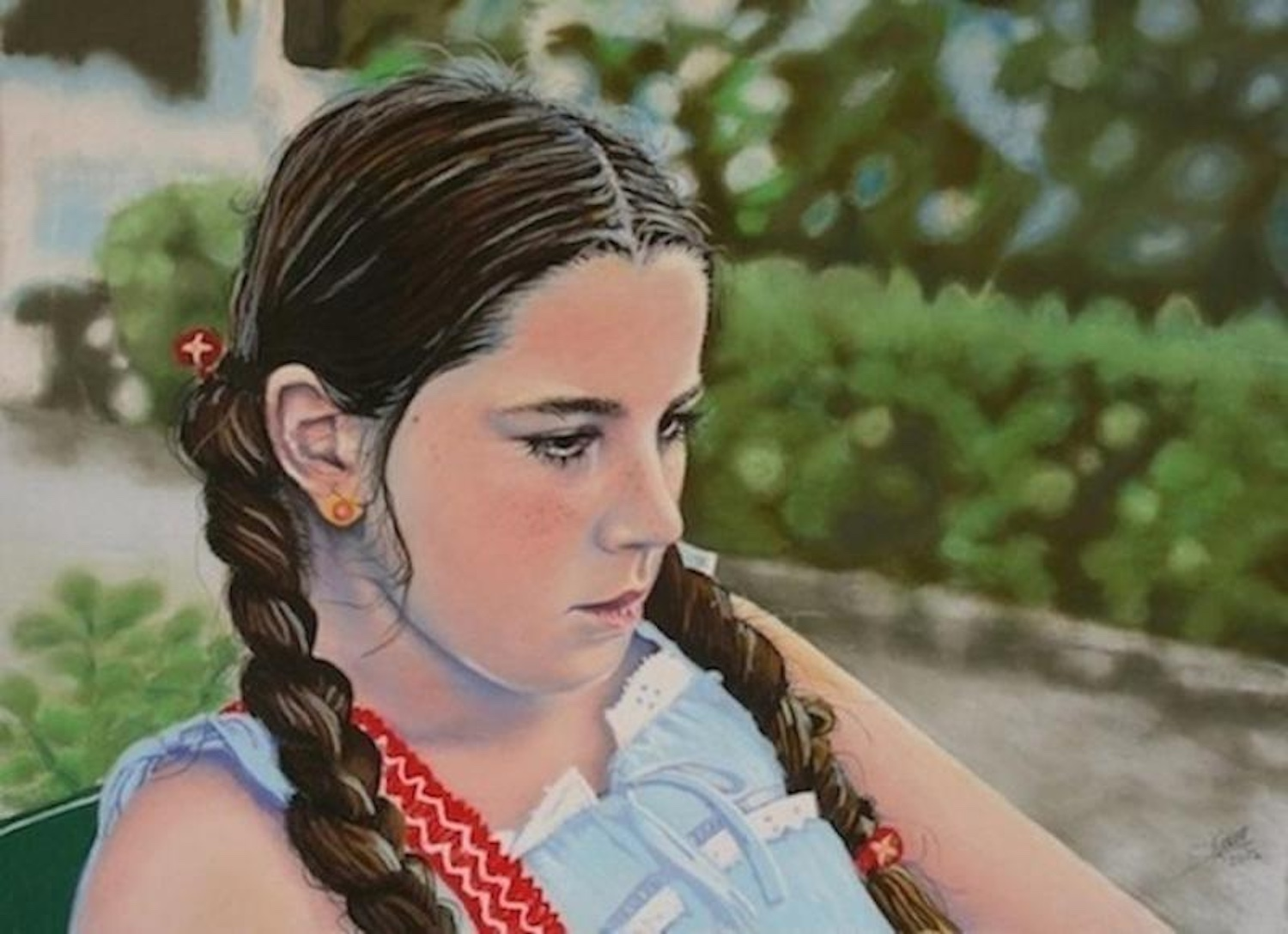
I am not a little girl anymore, pastel on sanded paper 22x28 inches

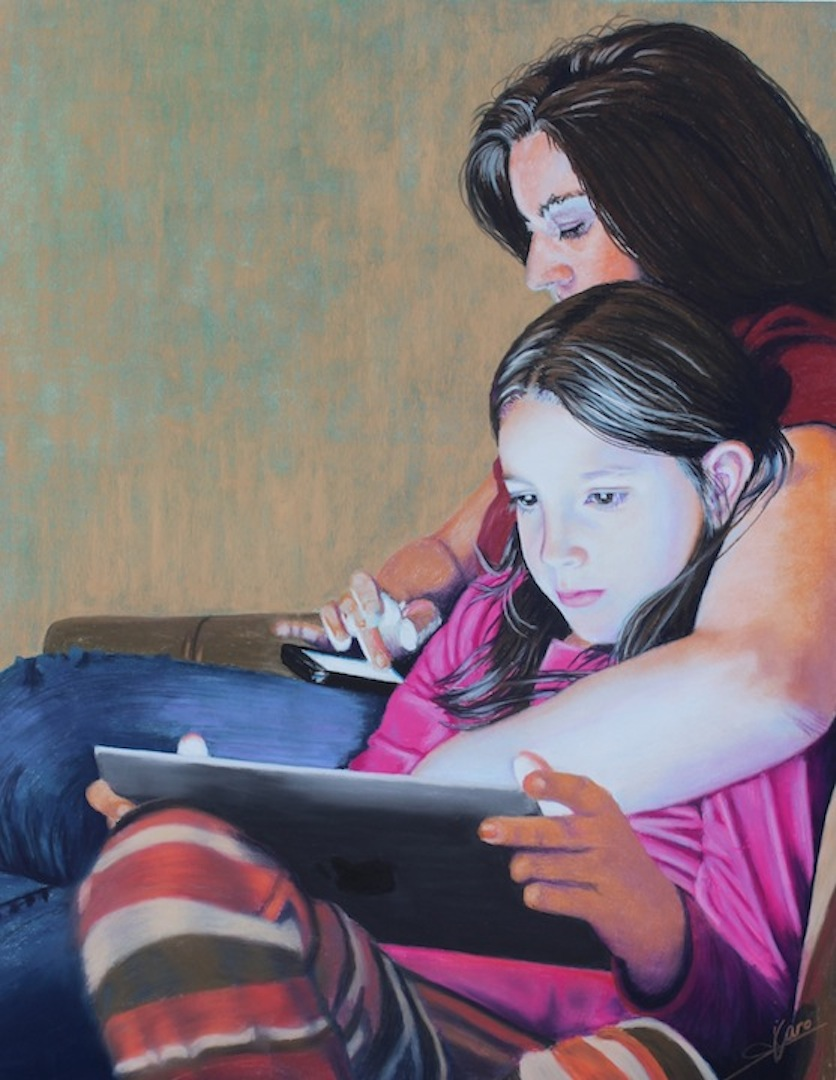
Maternity, pastel 22x28 inches

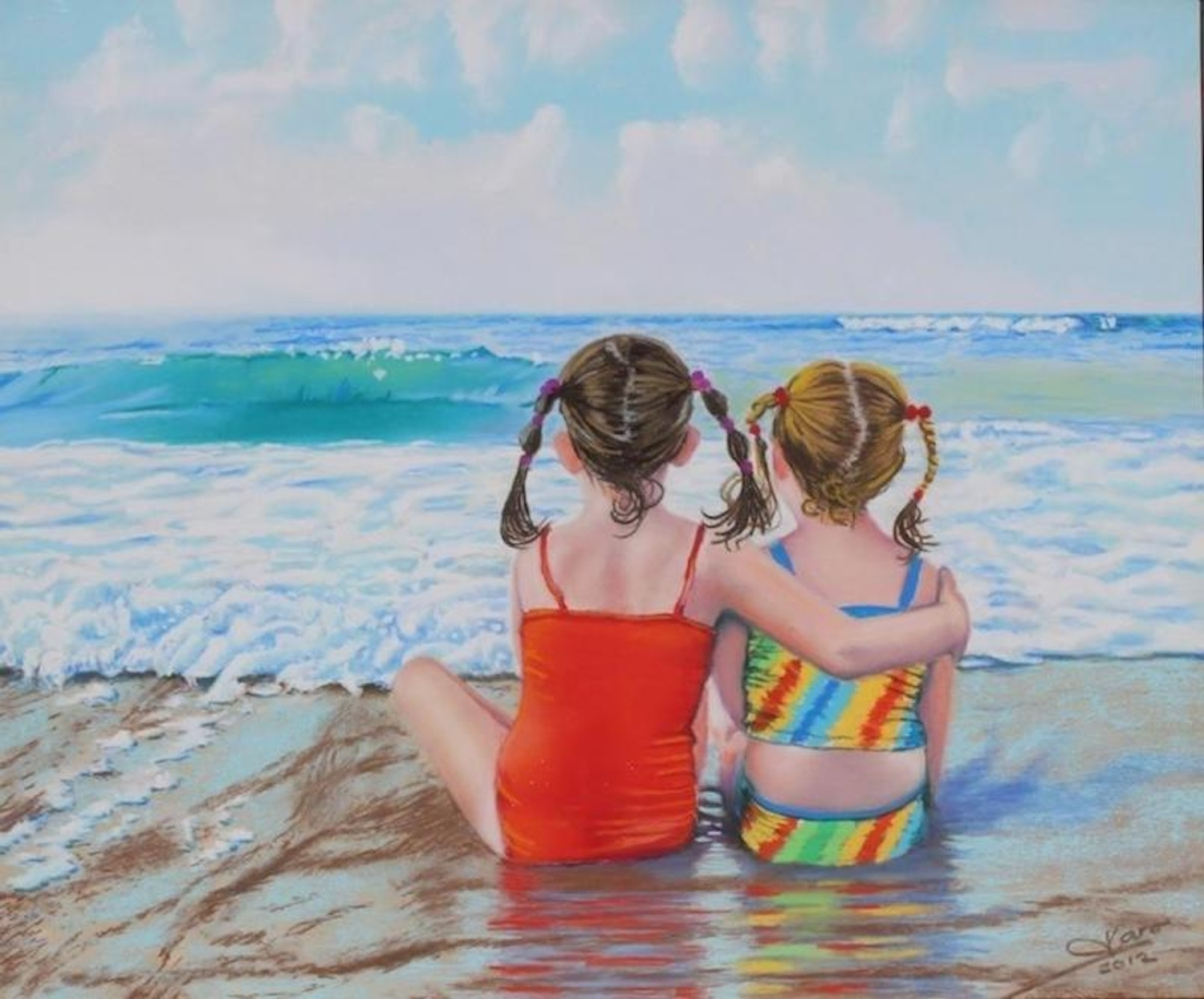
The Hug, pastel on sanded paper 22x26 inches

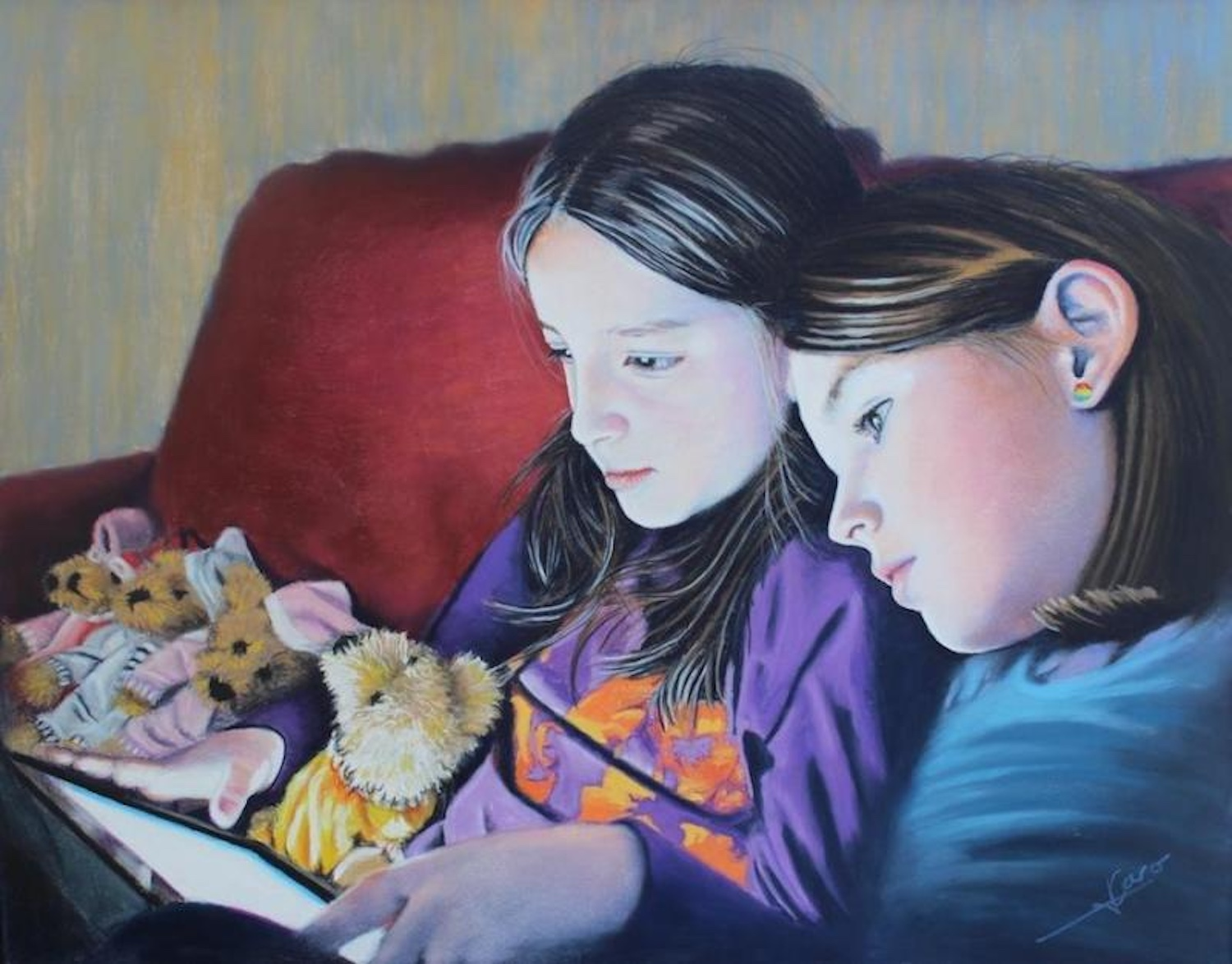
Choices, pastel on sanded paper 22x28

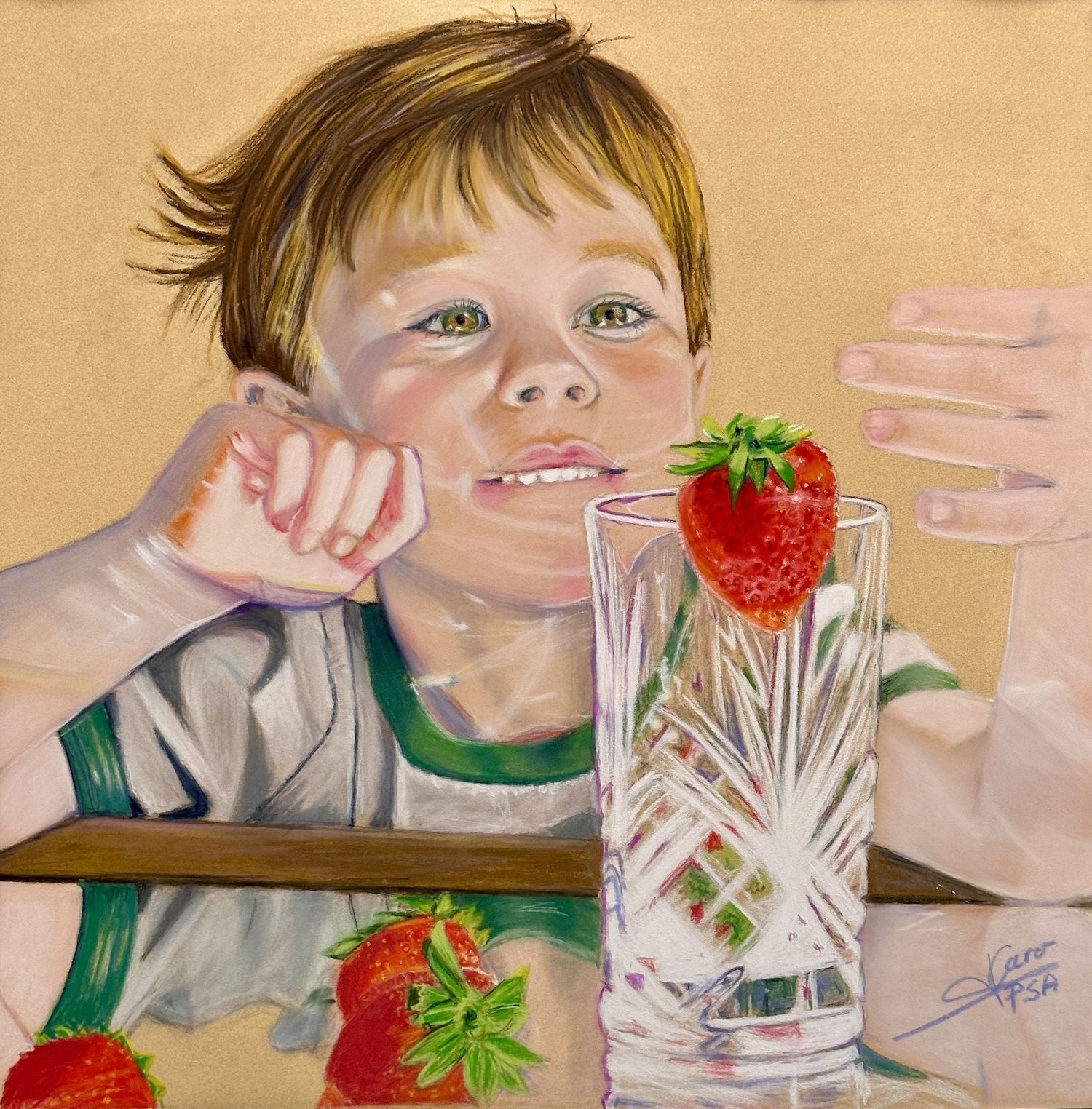
The Floating Strawberry, pastel on Sennelier paper 24x24 inches

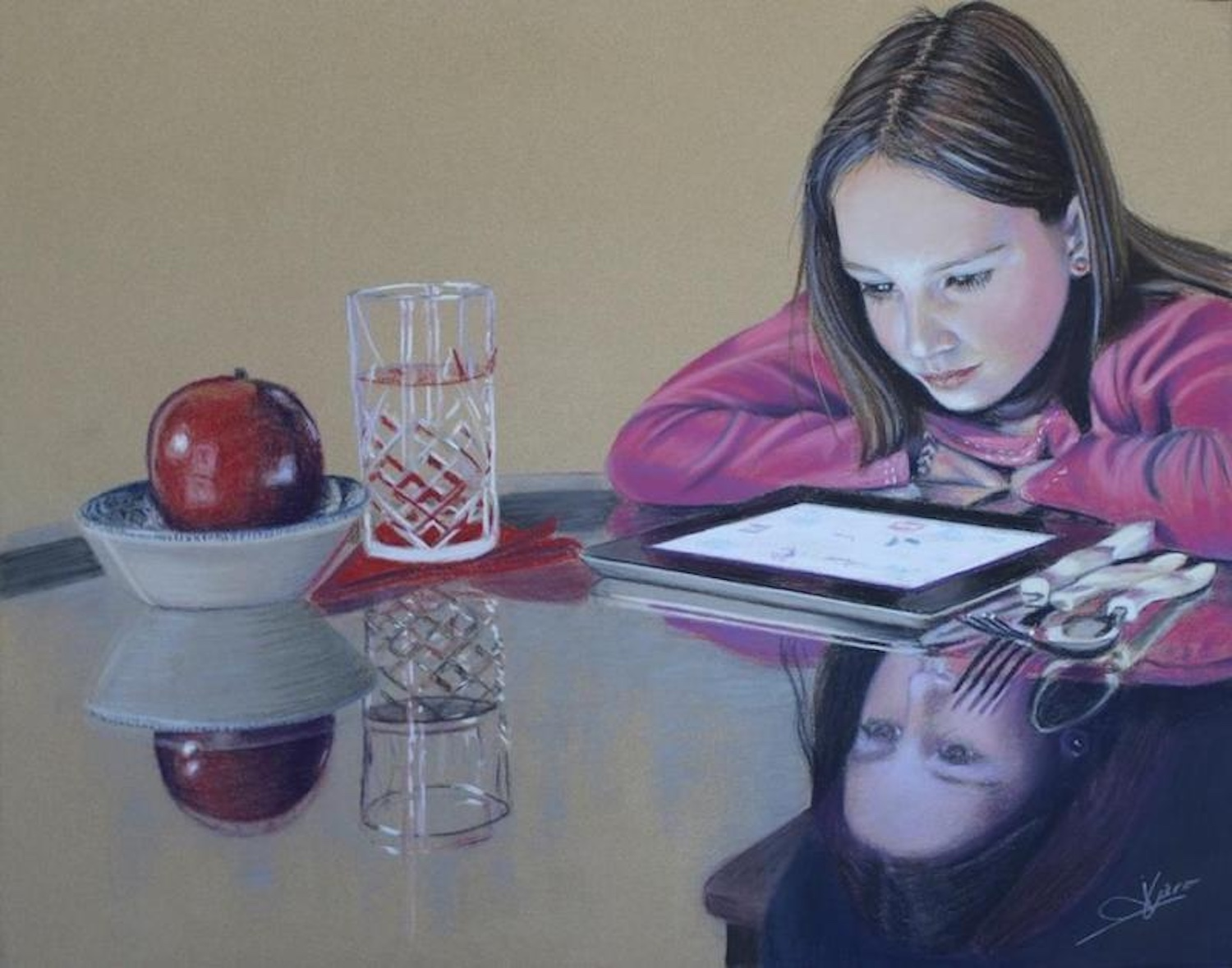
Quarantine, pastel on Sennelier paper 22x28

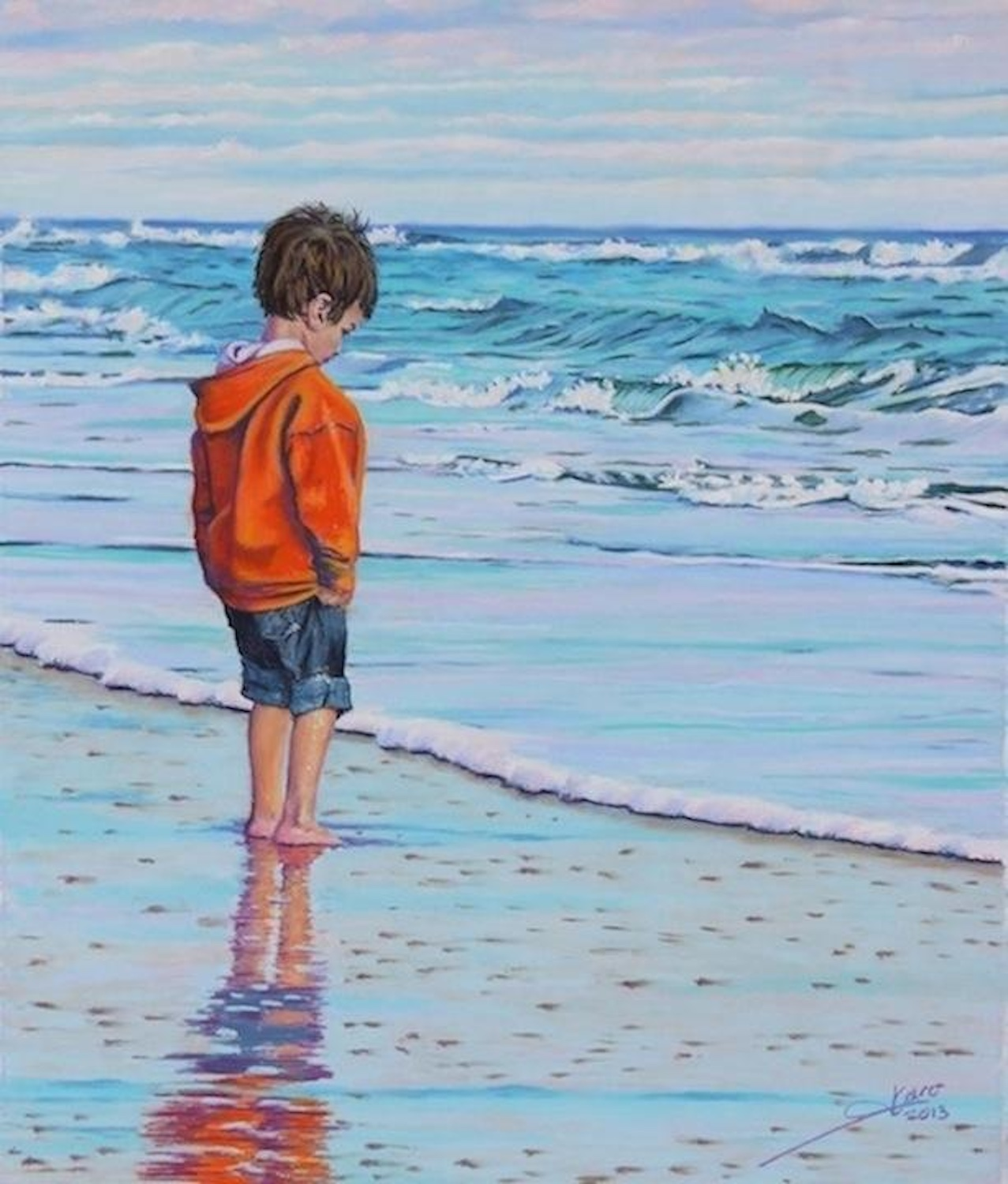
Shall I grow up, pastel on sanded paper 22x28

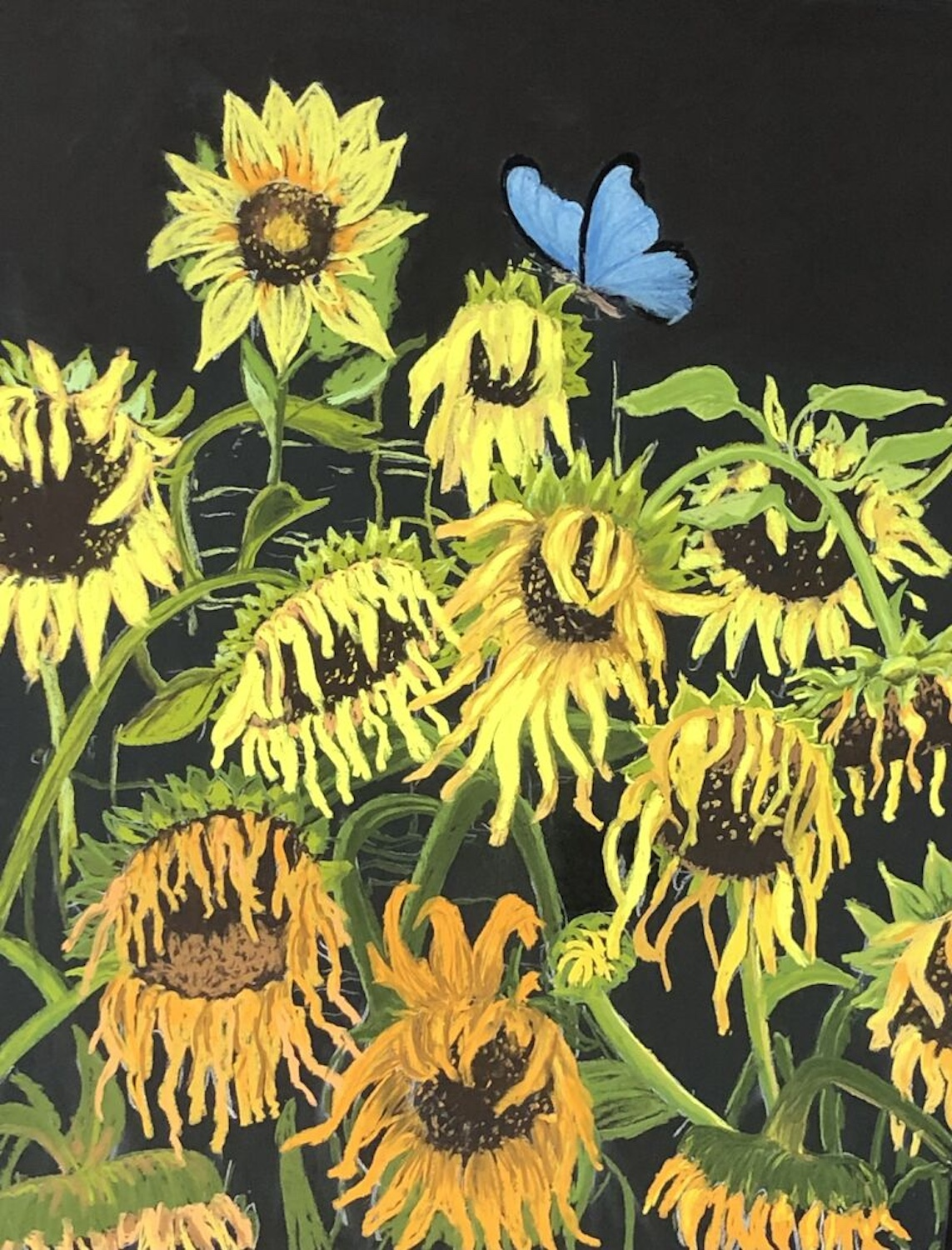
Ukraine, pastel on Sennelier paper 22x28
